= Lillian Dyck =

Retired Canadian senator

The Honourable Lillian Dyck OC

Senator from Saskatchewan
- In office March 24, 2005 – August 24, 2020
- Nominated by: Paul Martin
- Appointed by: Adrienne Clarkson

Personal details
- Born: Lillian Eva Quan Dyck; August 24, 1945 (age 81) North Battleford, Saskatchewan, Canada
- Party: Progressive Senate Group (2019–2020)
- Other political affiliations: Independent NDP (2005–2009); Liberal (2009–2014); Senate Liberal (2014–2019)
- Occupation: Neuroscientist; professor; researcher

Lillian Eva Quan Dyck, OC (born August 24, 1945) is a retired Canadian senator from Saskatchewan. A member of the Cree Gordon First Nation in Saskatchewan, and a first generation Chinese Canadian, she is the first female First Nations senator and first Canadian-born senator of Chinese descent.

Before being appointed to the Senate, Dyck was a neuroscientist with the University of Saskatchewan, where she was also an associate dean. On March 12, 1999, Dyck, who is one of the first Aboriginal women in Canada to pursue an academic career in the sciences, was presented with a lifetime achievement award by Indspire. She continues to teach at the university as well as conduct research on a part-time basis. In 2019 she received a Women of Distinction Awards Lifetime Achievement Award from the YWCA Saskatoon.

Alongside her research and academic work, the Honourable Dr. Lillian Eva Quan Dyck is well known for advocating for equity in the education and employment of women, Chinese Canadians and Aboriginals.

== Early life and education ==
Dyck was born in North Battleford, Saskatchewan, to a Chinese father, Yok Lee Quan, and Cree mother, Eva Muriel Mcnab. Her father came to Canada after paying the Head Tax, leaving his first family behind in China. Her mother was born on the Gordon Reserve, but lost her status when she married a non-Indian. She, like most First Nations women at the time, was sent to a residential school.

Dyck moved around frequently, living in many small towns in Saskatchewan and Alberta. Her family hid their Indigenous heritage in order to protect themselves from racism. Taking her father's last name of Quan, her family was essentially the only Chinese family in town. As most First Nations people were living on reserves, she had no connection to them. Her family was the only non-white family in town.

Her father ran a Chinese cafe. She grew up waitressing and doing many other jobs, such as at the Regal Cafe in Killam, Alberta, where her mother's tombstone lies.

Dyck attended Swift Current Collegiate Institute, where she was actively encouraged to go to university.

Dyck earned her Bachelor of Arts (Honours), Master of Science Degrees in Biochemistry in 1968 and 1970 respectively, as well as her Ph.D. in Biological Psychiatry in 1981, all from the University of Saskatchewan. She was conferred a Doctor of Letters, Honoris Causa by Cape Breton University in 2007.

== Career ==
=== Academic ===
Before being appointed to the Senate, Dyck was a neuroscientist with the University of Saskatchewan, where she was also associate dean. On March 12, 1999, Dyck, who is of Cree and Chinese heritage and was one of the first Aboriginal women in Canada to pursue an academic career in the sciences, was presented with a lifetime achievement award by Indspire. Her research focuses on mechanisms of action of monoamine oxidase inhibitors to identify drugs useful for treatment of neurological disorders and stroke. She continues to teach at the university as well as conduct research on a part-time basis.

=== Senate ===
Dyck was appointed to the Senate on the recommendation of Prime Minister Paul Martin on March 24, 2005.

Upon appointment, Dyck wished to sit as a New Democratic Party senator, but NDP spokesperson Karl Belanger immediately indicated that the party would not recognize her as a member of the NDP caucus: as the party platform specifically favours abolition of the Senate, it refused to confer legitimacy on the body by accepting Dyck; additionally, Dyck's membership in the NDP was revealed to have lapsed. Under the rules of the Senate, senators are free to designate themselves however they see fit, and Dyck changed her designation to say Independent New Democratic Party. On January 15, 2009, she joined the Liberal Senate caucus.

On January 29, 2014, Liberal Party leader Justin Trudeau announced all Liberal Senators, including Dyck, were removed from the Liberal caucus, and would continue sitting as Independents. The Senators referred to themselves as the Senate Liberal Caucus even though they are no longer members of the parliamentary Liberal caucus.

In 2014 Dyck accused Conservative MP Rob Clarke, who is also native, of "behaving like a white man" by pushing the Indian Act Amendment and Replacement Act. She later said she recognized the comment could be hurtful.

In April 2018 The Feminist Alliance for International Action recognized Lillian as a member of the Indigenous Famous Six. Other members are Jeannette Corbiere-Lavell, Yvonne Bedard, Sharon McIvor, Lynn Gehl, and Senator Sandra Lovelace Nicholas.

In November 2019, Dyck joined the rest of the Senate Liberal Caucus in deciding to dissolve the caucus and form the new Progressive Senate Group.

==== Political work ====
Dyck's priorities as a senator included Aboriginal women (Missing and Murdered Indigenous Women, Violence towards Aboriginal Women), Bill C-31 and its impact on Aboriginal women and men, women in science (recruitment and retention of women into professional scientific and technological careers), Aboriginal education and employment (recruitment and retention of aboriginals in the educational system and on the job), and mental health (the causes and treatment of psychiatric disorders).

She was outspoken on the issue of violence against women and successfully advocated for changes to legislation that will require judges to consider stiffer penalties for violent crimes against Indigenous women.

She also worked on Bill S-3, a bill that aimed to restore official Indian status for thousands of women who lost their status for marrying non-indigenous men.

===== Speeches =====
Selected Speeches by the Honourable Dr. Lillian Dyck
Date	Location	Speeches
June 26, 2018	Whitehorse, YK	CASHRA 2018, The Time is Now: Change & Innovation in Human Rights Today - Bill S-215: an Act of Reconciliation which would amend the criminal code to provide specific provisions for Aboriginal female victims of violence
May 15, 2018	Prince Albert, SK	Northern Justice Symposium 2018: Systemic Racism in the Criminal Justice System
August 27, 2017	Edmonton, AB	University of Alberta. Indigenization and improving Aboriginal student success in the Sciences.
August 26, 2017	Surrey, BC	What Does a Senator Do? My Work on Missing and Murdered Aboriginal Women and Girls.
October 28, 2015	Regina, SK	First Nations University of Canada, University of Regina. "Missing and Murdered Aboriginal Women and Girls: Revealing the Numbers Game."
May 6, 2010	Prince Albert, SK	Canadian Diabetes Association. "Diabetes and Aboriginal Canadians."
September 27, 2007	Scarborough, ON	Chinese Canadian National Council Dinner. “Chinese Canadian Issues.”
February 6, 2006	Saskatoon, SK	Saskatchewan Institute of Applied Science and Technology Conference. “Medicine Wheel and Science.”

== Works inspired by her ==
Café Daughter, a play written by Kenneth T. Williams, was a fictionalized account of Dyck's childhood. The play was adapted into the 2023 film Café Daughter by Mohawk filmmaker Shelley Niro.

== Bibliography ==
=== Selected academic publications ===
- Xu, Haiyun; Chen, Zhong; He, Jue; Haimanot, Samson; Li, Xiaokun; Dyck, Lillian; Li, Xin-Min (1 May 2006). "Synergetic effects of quetiapine and venlafaxine in preventing the chronic restraint stress-induced decrease in cell proliferation and BDNF expression in rat hippocampus". Hippocampus. 16 (6): 551–559. doi:10.1002/hipo.20184. PMID 16652337. S2CID 19976346.
- Wang, Haitao; Xu, Haiyun; Dyck, Lillian E.; Li, Xin-Min (15 August 2005). "Olanzapine and quetiapine protect PC12 cells from β-amyloid peptide25-35-induced oxidative stress and the ensuing apoptosis". Journal of Neuroscience Research. 81 (4): 572–580. doi:10.1002/jnr.20570. PMID 15948179. S2CID 7012723.
- Wei, Zelan; Mousseau, Darrell D.; Richardson, J. Steven; Dyck, Lillian E.; Li, Xin-Min (15 December 2003). "Atypical Antipsychotics Attenuate Neurotoxicity of β-Amyloid(25-35) by Modulating Bax and Bcl-XL/S Expression and Localization". Journal of Neuroscience Research. 74 (6): 942–947. doi:10.1002/jnr.10832. PMID 14648600. S2CID 22748090.
- Dyck, Lillian E. (1996). "An Analysis of Western, Feminist and Aboriginal Science Using the Medicine Wheel of the Plains Indians". Native Studies Review. 11 (2): 90–102.
- Dyck, Lillian E.; Durden, David A.; Boulton, Alan A. (24 March 1993). "Effects of monoamine oxidase inhibitors on the acid metabolites of some trace amines and of dopamine in the rat striatum". Biochemical Pharmacology. 45 (6): 1317–1322. doi:10.1016/0006-2952(93)90285-5. PMID 8466551.
- Dyck, Lillian E. (1993). "Absence of the atypical mitochondrial aldehyde dehydrogenase (ALDH2) isozyme in Saskatchewan Cree Indians". Human Heredity. 43 (2): 116–120. doi:10.1159/000154127. PMID 8359813.
- Dyck, Lillian E.; Durden, David A.; Boulton, Alan A. (1993). "Conjugation of phenylacetic acid and m- and p-hydroxyphenylacetic acids in the rat striatum". Life Sciences. 53 (11): 901–909. doi:10.1016/0024-3205(93)90442-6. PMID 8366757.
- Dyck, Lillian E. (1990). "Isoenzymes of aldehyde dehydrogenase in human lymphocytes". Alcoholism: Clinical and Experimental Research. 14 (4): 534–538. doi:10.1111/j.1530-0277.1990.tb01195.x. PMID 2221279.
- Dyck, Lillian E. (1989). "Release of some endogenous trace amines from rat striatal slices in the presence and absence of a monoamine oxidase inhibitor". Life Sciences. 44 (17): 1149–1156. doi:10.1016/0024-3205(89)90309-3. PMID 2716465.
- Dyck, Lillian E. (1986). "Are North American Indians Biochemically More Susceptible to the Effects of Alcohol?". Native Studies Review. 2 (2): 85–95.
- Dyck, Lillian E.; Durden, David A.; Boulton, Alan A. (1 June 1985). "Formation of beta-phenylethylamine from the antidepressant, beta-phenylethylhydrazine". Biochemical Pharmacology. 34 (11): 1925–1929. doi:10.1016/0006-2952(85)90310-7. PMID 4004908.
- Dyck, Lillian E.; Yang, C.R.; Boulton, Alan A. (1983). "The biosynthesis of p-tyramine, m-tyramine, and beta-phenylethylamine by rat striatal slices". Journal of Neuroscience Research. 10 (2): 211–220. doi:10.1002/jnr.490100209. PMID 6632007. S2CID 39429393.
- Dyck, Lillian E.; Kazakoff, Clement W.; Dourish, Colin T. (22 October 1982). "The role of catecholamines, 5-hydroxytryptamine and m-tyramine in the behavioural effects of m-tyrosine in the rat". European Journal of Pharmacology. 84 (3–4): 139–149. doi:10.1016/0014-2999(82)90196-0. PMID 7173317.
- Wu, P. H.; Dyck, Lillian E. (May 1976). "Microassay for the estimation of monoamine oxidase activity". Analytical Biochemistry. 72 (7): 637–642. doi:10.1016/0003-2697(76)90577-7. PMID 942080.
- Boulton, Alan A.; Dyck, Lillian E.; Durden, David A. (December 1974). "Hydroxylation of beta-phenylethylamine in the rat". Life Sciences. 15 (9): 1673–1683. doi:10.1016/0024-3205(74)90334-8. PMID 4550004.

=== Non-academic publications ===
- Dyck, Lillian E. "Dare to be brave: stand up for yourself." In : Women in the Canadian academic tundra: challenging the chill. (eds.) Elena Hannah, Linda Paul, Swani Vethamany-Globus. (Montreal : McGill-Queen's University Press; c2002) : 47-50.
- Dyck, Lillian E.."The University of Saskatchewan: a portrait." Women's Education. 9:2 (1991) :23.
