= Riin Tamm =

Estonian geneticist

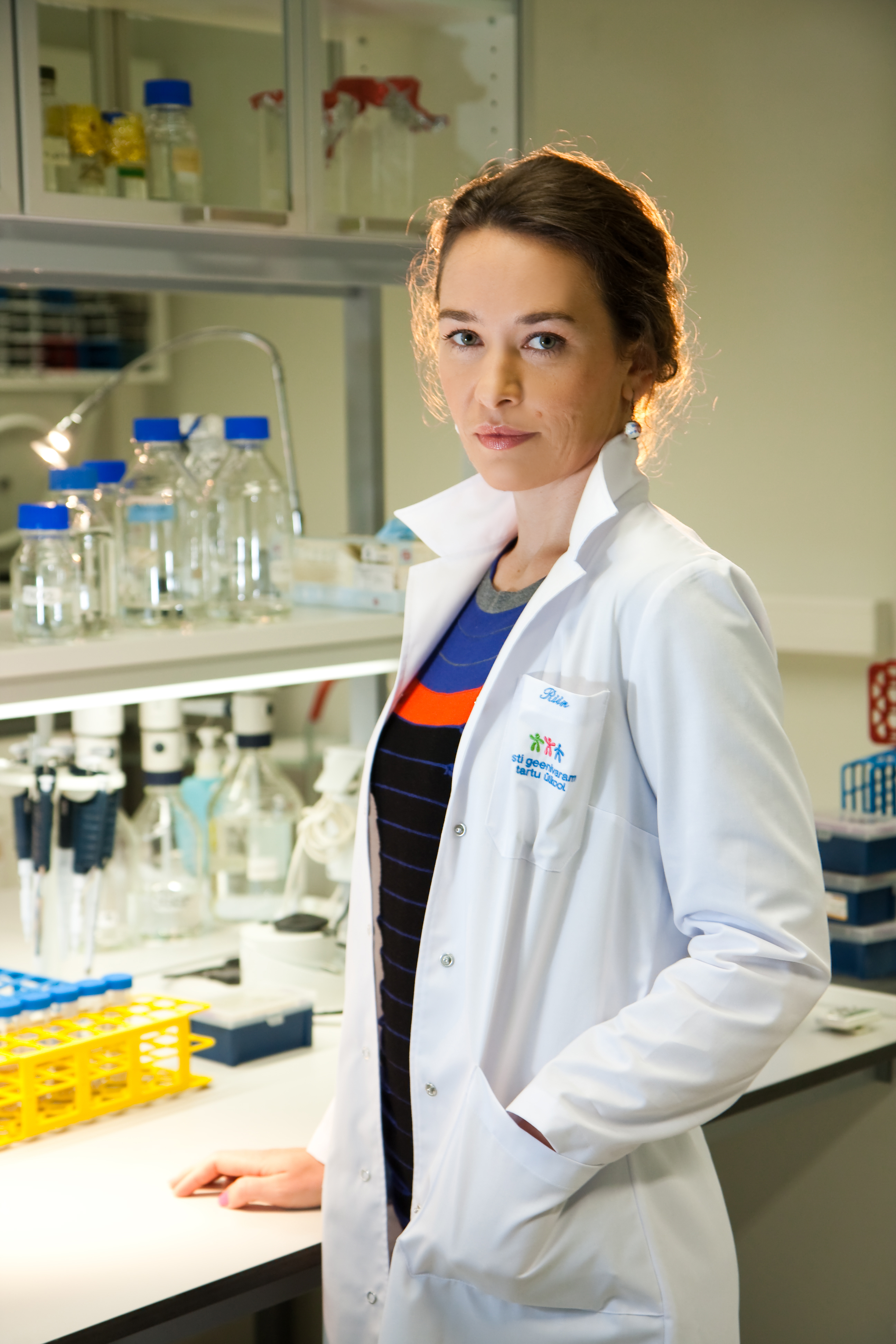
- Born: 12 August 1981 (age 44); Tartu, Estonia
- Occupation: Genetic scientist
- Known for: Genetics; Science communication

Riin Tamm (born 12 August 1981) is an Estonian geneticist and a proponent of science in popular culture. She is head of the Department of Youth and Talent Policy within the Estonian Ministry of Education and Research. She has previously served as the director of the University of Tartu Youth Academy.

== Early life and education ==
Tamm was born in Tartu and grew up in the village of Peri, near Põlva. She is the daughter of two doctors. She attended Miina Härma Gymnasium in Tartu between 1997 and 2000. From 2001 to 2005, she was an undergraduate at the University of Tartu studying molecular diagnosis, and from 2005 to 2007 studied for her master's degree, which she obtained in 2007. Her master's thesis, prepared under the supervision of Andres Metspalu and Kersti Oselin, was entitled Human thiopurine methyltransferase pharmacogenetics: genotype-phenotype correlation and haplotype analysis in the Estonian population. Following this, she began her PhD studies in human genetics.

== Publications and appearances ==
Tamm has published in scientific journals and presented research to a broader public in other venues, including the newspaper Postimees, Radio Kuku's program Falling Apple (Kukkuv õun – 28 August 2010), and Eesti Televisioon's program Good Vision (15 October 2008, 20 October 2011, 17 January 2012). She has been one of the judges in the Estonian science competition show Rakett69.

Tamm has said that doctors are conservative and still have relatively little interest in using genetic information to improve treatment. In a June 2012 interview she said that more work is needed to map out the human genetic structure, but much has been accomplished already. Genetic information may help to determine the risk of certain diseases and may be useful in determining appropriate drug treatments.

== Professional service ==
Tamm is a board member of the Estonian Society of Human Genetics and the Estonian Association of Gerontology and Geriatrics, and is Chair of the Scientific Program Committee of the Annual International Gene Forum conference organized by the Estonian Genome Foundation. In 2011 she was chosen as one of 26 scientists to travel around Estonia and take part in events at schools and academic institutions as part of an initiative by the Archimedes Foundation and the Ministry of Education and Research.

== Awards ==
In 2012 she was given second prize for Estonian National Science Communication in the category "Best popularizing scientist, journalist, teacher, etc. in the field of science and technology".

== Publications ==
Tamm has authored or co-authored various papers on subjects related to human genetics and gerontology, including the following:

- Milek, M.; Smid, A.; Tamm, R.; Karas Kuzelicki, N.; Metspalu, A.; Mlinaric-Rascan, I. (2012). "Post-translational stabilization of thiopurine S-methyltransferase by S-adenosyl-L-methionine reveals regulation of TPMT*1 and *3C allozymes". Biochemical Pharmacology. 83 (7): 969–976. doi:10.1016/j.bcp.2012.01.010. PMID 22274639.
- Tamm, R. (2010). "Novel human pathological mutations. Gene symbol: SPAST. Disease: Hereditary spastic paraplegia". Human Genetics. 127 (1): 112. PMID 20108387.
- Tamm, Riin; Saks, Kai; Pääsuke, Mati (2010). "Research on ageing and longevity in Estonia". Reviews in Clinical Gerontology. 20 (2): 154–159. doi:10.1017/s0959259810000134.
- Kuningas, M.; May, L.; Tamm, R.; van Bodegom, D.; van den Biggelaar, A. H. J.; Meij, J. J.; Frölich, M.; Ziem, J. B.; Suchiman, H. E. D.; Metspalu, A.; Slagboom, P. E.; Westendorp, R. G. J (2009). "Selection for Genetic Variation Inducing Pro-Inflammatory Responses under Adverse Environmental Conditions in a Ghanaian Population". PLoS ONE. 4 (11) e7795. Bibcode:2009PLoSO...4.7795K. doi:10.1371/journal.pone.0007795. PMC 2771352. PMID 19907653.
- Tamm, R.; Oselin, K.; Kallassalu, K.; Magi, R.; Anier, K.; Remm, M.; Metspalu, A. (2008). "Thiopurine S-methyltransferase (TPMT) pharmacogenetics: three new mutations and haplotype analysis in the Estonian population". Clinical Chemistry and Laboratory Medicine. 46 (7): 974–979. doi:10.1515/CCLM.2008.187. PMID 18605963. S2CID 13437371.
- Oselin, K.; Anier, K.; Tamm, R.; Kallassalu, K.; Mäeorg, U. (2006). "Determination of thiopurine S-methyltransferase (TPMT) activity by comparing various normalization factors: Reference values for Estonian population using HPLC-UV assay". Journal of Chromatography B. 834 (1–2): 77–83. doi:10.1016/j.jchromb.2006.02.031. PMID 16517227.

According to the Web of Science, her publications have been cited 23 times, giving Tamm an h-index of 3.
