= Florida State University College of Arts and Sciences =

College of Arts and Sciences
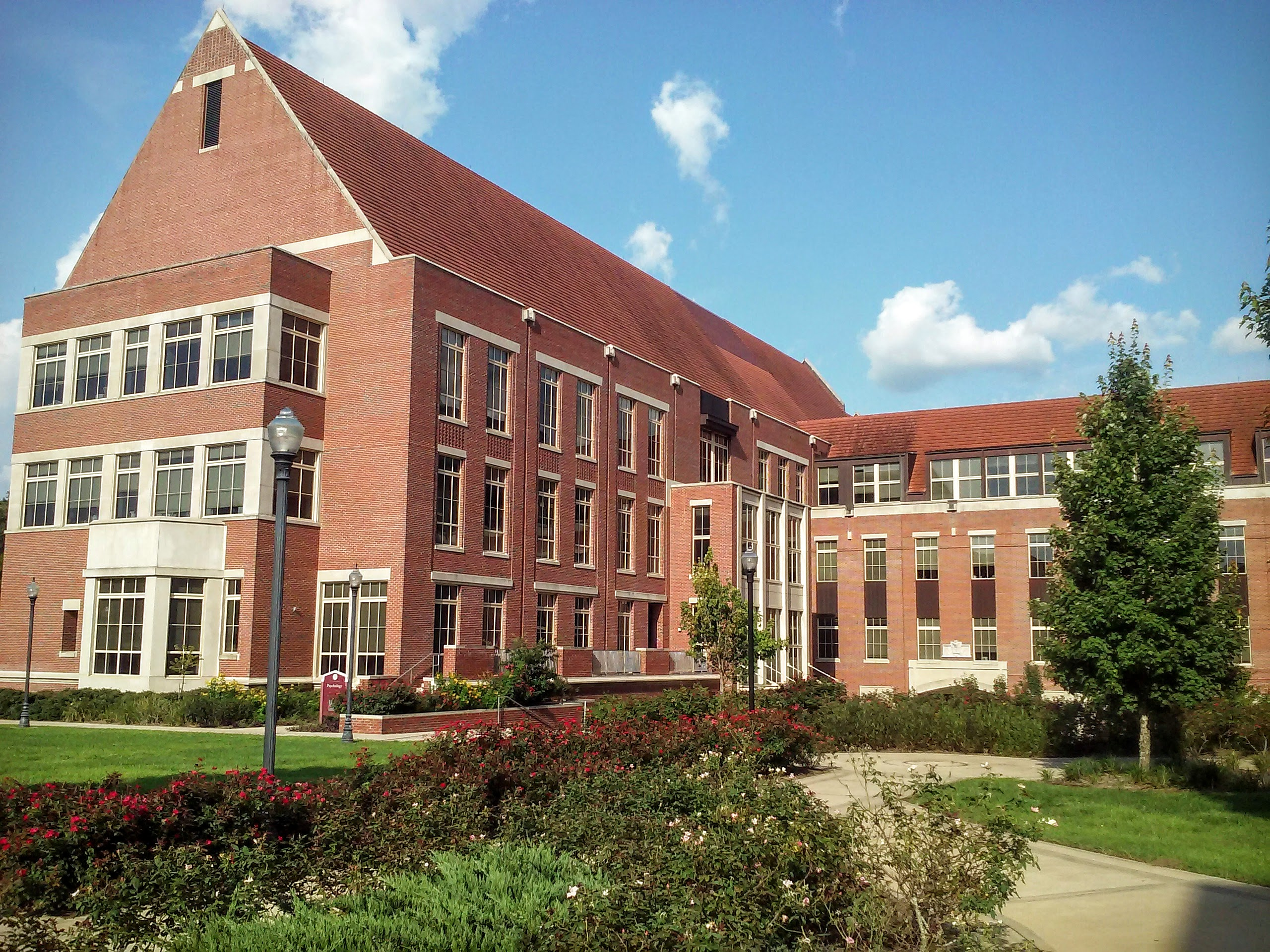
- Type: Public
- Established: 1901
- Dean: Sam Huckaba
- Students: 11,000 students
- Location: Tallahassee, Florida, U.S. 30°26′31.4″N 84°17′31.6″W
- Website: www.artsandsciences.fsu.edu

The College of Arts and Sciences is the largest of the 17 colleges at Florida State University.

== Background ==
The college hosts the majors of nearly 11,000 students and comprises 18 departments, nine interdisciplinary programs, and 14 centers, programs, and institutes. Each academic year, approximately 2,600 degrees are awarded to graduates. The faculty-to-student ratio currently stands at 22:1. Notably, approximately 50 percent of the faculty and Teaching Assistants (TAs) in the Arts and Sciences (A&S) division are responsible for teaching almost half of all credit hours offered.

The college covers a broad spectrum of disciplines, including social sciences, liberal arts, mathematics, sciences, and interdisciplinary studies. Faculty members have earned national and international acclaim for their excellence in teaching, research, and contributions to their respective fields. Significant honors such as the Martin Luther King Jr. Distinguished Scholar Awards, University Teaching and Advising Awards, and Developing Scholar Awards have been bestowed upon 125 faculty members within the Arts and Sciences college.

== History ==
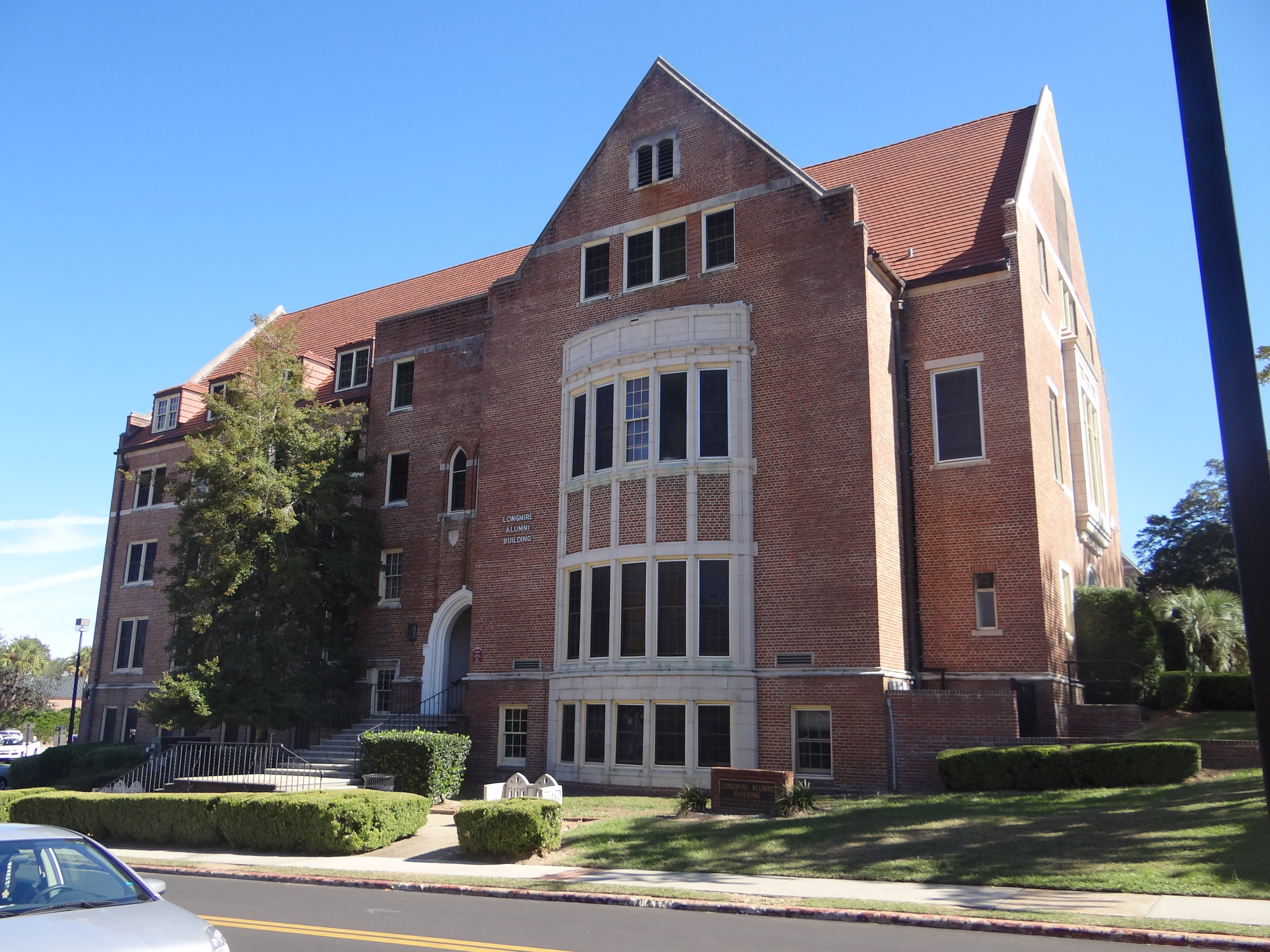
Longmire Building

Founded in 1901 in the Florida State College, the College of Arts and Sciences is one of the university's oldest colleges. The college only offered bachelor's degrees until 1908, when the college introduced its first master's degree program. In the following year, the institution, originally known as the Florida Female College, changed its name to Florida State College for Women and issued its first master's degree under that name in 1909. In 1952, doctorates were given out by the College of Arts and Sciences.

The College of Arts and Sciences occupies multiple buildings on campus, such as Dodd Hall, the Bellamy Building, the Psychology Building, and the Williams Building. The dean's office is located in the Longmire Building.

In July 2011, Sam Huckaba, who served as the associate dean of the College of Arts and Sciences, stepped in as the interim dean. Huckaba's position as the dean was officially confirmed in October 2012.

== Departments ==
=== Biological sciences ===
The Department of Biological Science includes faculty in cellular and molecular biology, computational biology, evolution and ecology, and neuroscience to guide students earning their MS or PhD. In 2008, the James E. King Life Sciences Building opened, giving the Department of Biological Science a new home. Numerous careers can stem from this department, as it provides diverse undergraduate programs for biomedical sciences, biotechnology, neuroscience, marine science, conservation, and environmental biology. This department conducts several labs so students can conduct research and publish their papers for scientific review, with opportunities to earn rewards and scholarships from them.

=== Chemistry and biochemistry ===
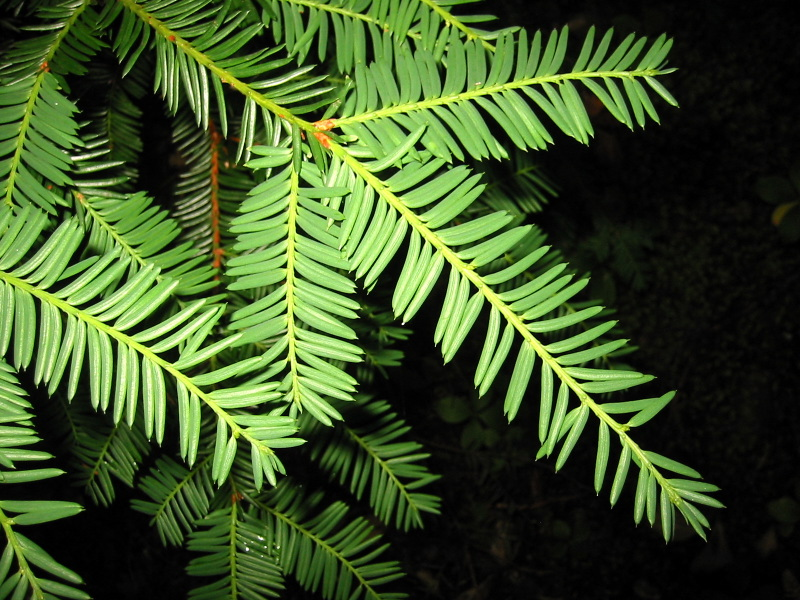
Pacific Yew tree — the source of Taxol. As Pacific yew trees were harvested for the drug tamoxifen faster than they could grow back, a crisis emerged in the supply of a beneficial anti-cancer medication. FSU's semisynthetic Taxol greatly improved the supply of this anti-cancer drug.

Research in the Department of Chemistry and Biochemistry ranges from analytical through organic.

A five-story 168,000-square-foot (15,600 m^{2}) Chemistry Building opened on May 2, 2008.

Also having worked in the field of materials science and nanoscience at FSU is the Nobel laureate Sir Harry Kroto, the co-discoverer of the C_{60} "buckyball", who retired from FSU's Department of Chemistry and Biochemistry in 2015.

==== Taxol — anti-cancer drug ====
Chemistry professor and synthetic organic chemist Robert A. Holton synthesized tamoxifen on December 9, 1993. The synthesized version, Taxol, has been used as an effective breast cancer and ovarian cancer treatment.

Holton and his organic chemistry team developed a cheaper semisynthetic version (Holton Taxol total synthesis). In 1993, Bristol-Myers Squibb began marketing Taxol, ultimately earning more than $1.6 billion by the year 2000.

Before the drug company's exclusive license expired, Florida State earned $351 million in royalties. In addition, polymer chemist and professor, Joseph Schlenoff, holds 30 patents relating to his research into multilayers and hydrogels.

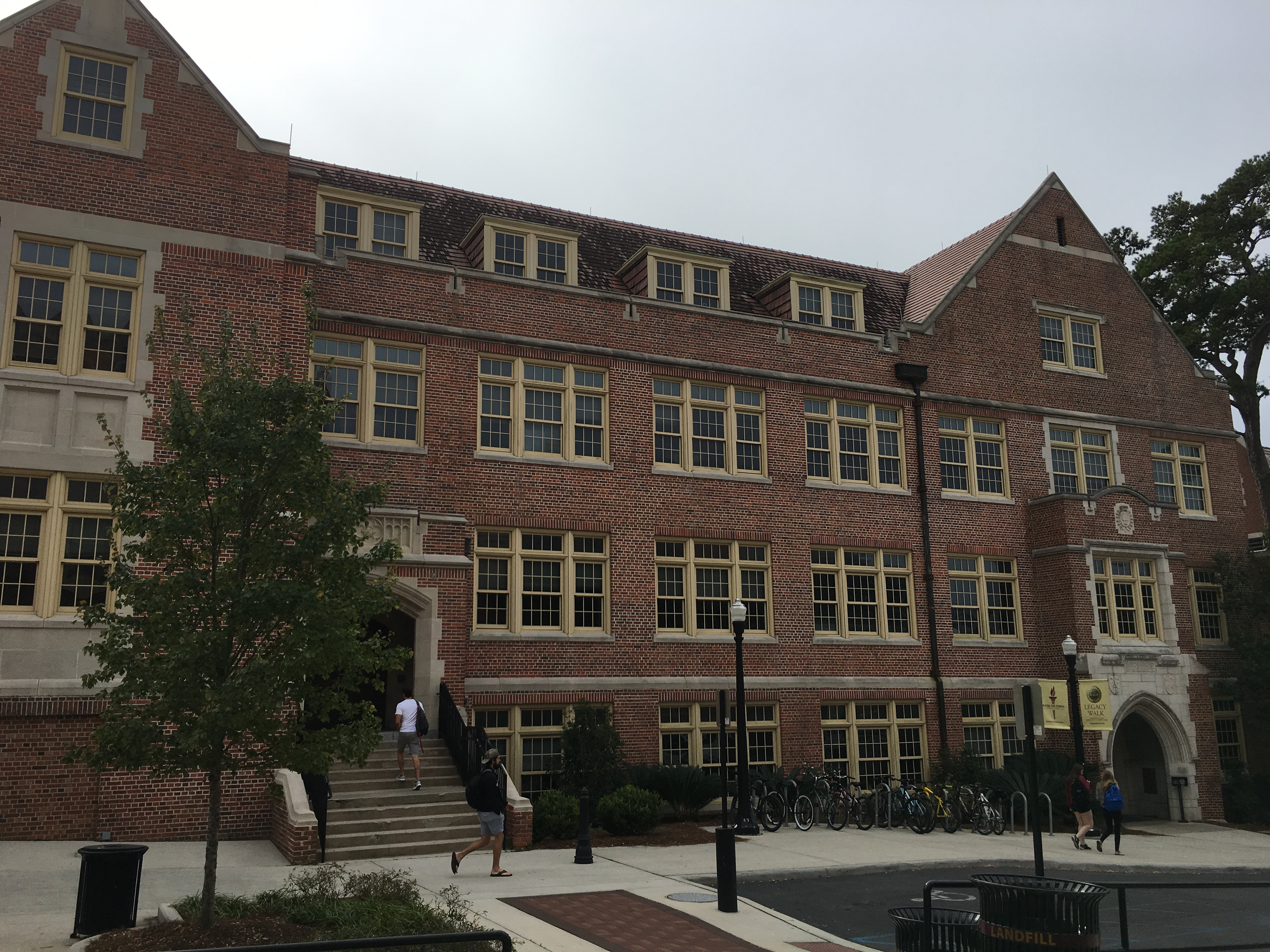
This is an image of the FSU Williams Building, which houses the majority of the English major classes.

=== English ===
The Department of English at FSU encompasses many majors and produces several journals such as the Kudzu Review, The Southeast Review, and The Journal of Early Modern Studies. Comprising a wide range of topics, the faculty includes winners of Guggenheim, National Endowment for the Arts, Fulbright, and Newberry Library fellowships.

=== Earth, Ocean, and Atmospheric Science ===
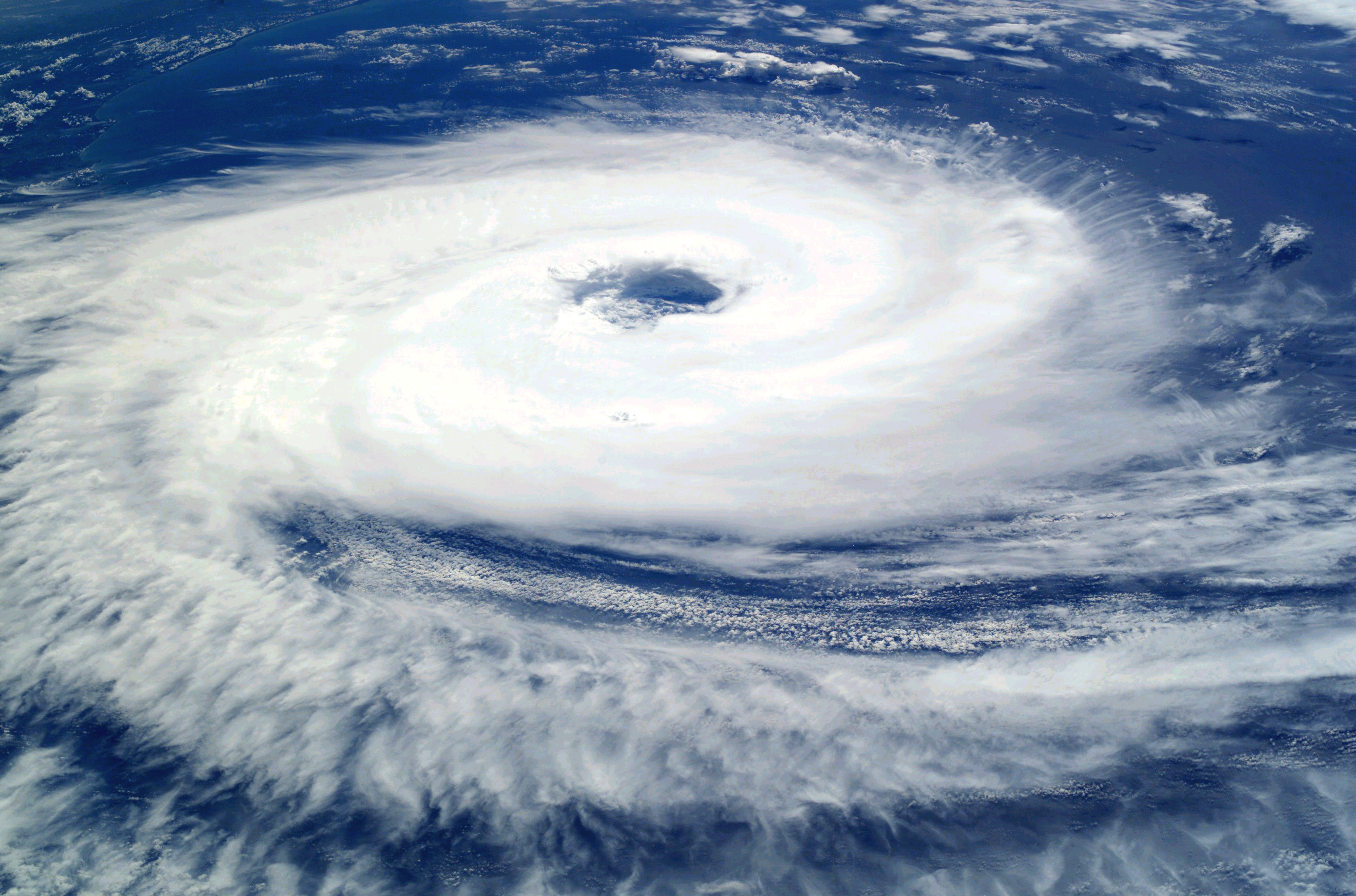
Cyclone Catarina, a rare South Atlantic tropical cyclone viewed from the International Space Station on March 26, 2004

==== Meteorology ====
Founded in 1949, the FSU meteorology program is the largest and most complete meteorology program in the southeastern United States, with 17 faculty members, over 85 graduate students, and approximately 200 undergraduate students.

=== Physics ===
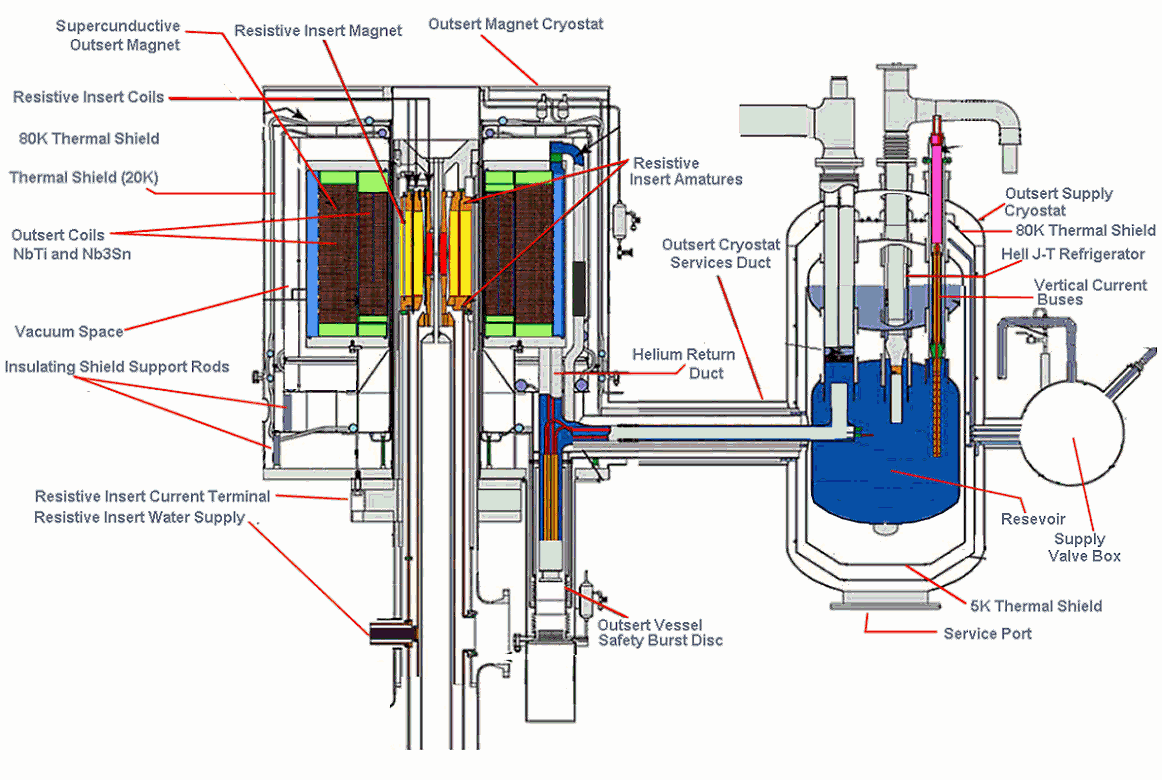
Diagram of the 45-tesla hybrid magnet at the National High Magnetic Field Laboratory

The Department of Physics has more than 60 faculty, and over 100 graduate students.

The department has its own superconducting linear particle accelerator at which experiments ranging from precision atomic measurements to analysis of rare-isotope collisions are performed. The department maintains active groups working on experiments at Fermilab, CERN, Brookhaven National Laboratory, TJNAF, Argonne National Laboratory, and several others. Indirectly, through current director Dr. Gregory Boebinger as well as his predecessor, laboratory founder Dr. Jack Crow, the department operates the main complex of the multi discipline National High Magnetic Field Laboratory, located near campus at FSU's Innovation Park.

=== Psychology ===
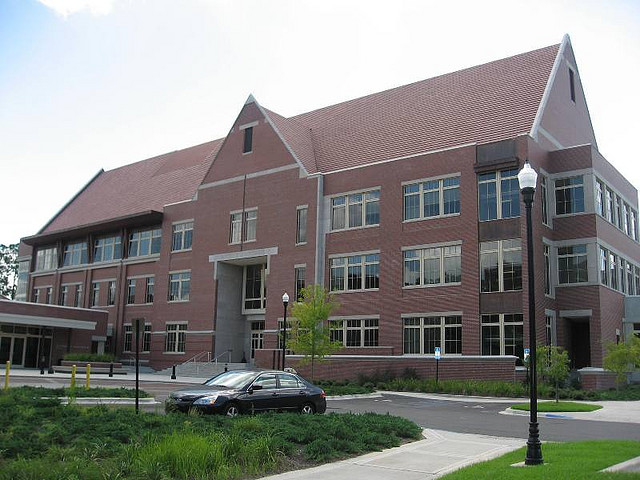
The Psychology Building at FSU opened in 2008.

FSU's Psychology Department has been an education and research institution in the university for more than 100 years, and was the first psychological laboratory in Florida.

The department is the center of research in many areas with more than 30 research laboratories and $2 million in new grants being awarded in 2015. In 2020, PhD program in clinical psychology was ranked 27th by U.S. News & World Report and the department itself was ranked 60th.
