= LLS =

LLS may refer to:

- LanguageLine Solutions, an American on-demand and onsite language interpretation and document translation service
- The Late Late Show (Irish talk show), the world's longest-running television talk show
- Lateral line system, sense organ used by some fish and larval lissamphibians to detect movement and vibrations
- Leukemia & Lymphoma Society, charitable organization funding blood cancer research, education and patient services
- Liberal Union of Lithuania, a former political party in Lithuania
- Light Louisiana Sweet, type of crude oil
- Linear least squares
- Lithuanian Freedom Union (Liberals), a political party in Lithuania
- Longest linear sequence, a concept in synthetic chemistry
- Loyola Law School, Los Angeles, California
- Lifelong Learning Service, an online and modern learning service which main purpose is to offer specialized education unlimitless throughout new technologies (in Spanish)
- Leiden Longevity Study, an observational study

== Films ==
- Laal Singh Chaddha, a 2022 Indian film starring Aamir Khan.
