= Gordon's Indian Residential School =

Boarding school in Saskatchewan, Canada

Coordinates: 51.2878809°N 104.4379283°W

- Punnichy, Saskatchewan

Information
- Other name: Gordon Student Residence
- Former names: Gordon School (1876); Gordon Boarding School (1889); Gordon's Indian School (1893)
- Type: Residential school
- Denomination: Anglican
- Established: 1876
- Closed: 1996 (30 years ago)
- Locale: George Gordon Reserve
- Owner: Government of Canada

Gordon's Indian Residential School was a boarding school for George Gordon First Nation students in Punnichy, Saskatchewan, and was the last federally-funded residential school in Canada. It was located adjacent to the George Gordon Reserve.

Between 1876 and 1946, the school was managed by the Anglican Church of Canada, under the auspices of the Diocese of Qu'Appelle. It was then managed by the Church's Indian & Eskimo Welfare Commission, and later its Indian School Administration. In April 1969, administration for the school was transferred to the Government of Canada. From then onward, the Anglican Church provided chaplaincy services to the school. In 1996, Gordon Student Residence was closed and the main building was demolished.

== History ==
Named after Chief George Gordon, the George Gordon Reserve was established in 1874, under Treaty 4, in Punnichy, Saskatchewan, within the Touchwood Hills area. Though there was a day school in Touchwood Hills, operated by Church Missionary Society (CMS), it was located far away from the new reserve. As such, the CMS relocated in 1876 to Crown land on the edge of the reserve, where it established the Gordon School. (The year 1876 also saw the passing of the Indian Act). CMS continued to administer the school until 1886, when all activities and properties of the Mission were turned over to the newly created Diocese of Qu’Appelle (the Anglican Church of Canada).

In 1888, with funding from the Government of Canada, the school building was expanded to accommodate boarders (i.e., residential students) for the first time. (The federal government had paid for all capital improvements to the school since 1888.) It accordingly changed its name to the Gordon Boarding School in 1889; at that time, there were 15 boarders and 3 day students, according to reports from Indian agents.

Between 1893 and 1895, the school changed its name to Gordon's Indian School and gained a new two-storey building, thereby expanding its capacity to 30 students. In 1915, the federal government again expanded the school and raised authorized capacity to 45 students.

The school experienced a major fire in 1921, and was replaced the following year with a new capacity for 100 students. While most of the Anglican residential schools came under the control of the Missionary Society of the Church of England in Canada (MSCC) in 1923, the Diocese of Qu’Appelle retained control of Gordon's.

It was eventually renamed to Gordon's Indian Residential School in 1926.

On 1 February 1929, another fire destroyed the school building; its replacement opened the following year in September, with an increased pupilage of 120. In 1946, the Indian & Eskimo Welfare Commission of the Anglican Church of Canada took control of managing the school.

Between 1947 and 1953, problems with water supply and maintenance led to the school being closed for much of that period. In 1957, the school saw its first pupils sent to high school, at Prince Albert, Saskatchewan. Boy Scouts, Cub Scouts, Girl Guides, and Brownies were formed at the school the following year.

On 1 April 1969, the Canadian government began directly operating the school, with domestic staff being transferred to the federal payroll. The institution was thereafter renamed the Gordon Student Residence, administered by William Starr, with the educational sector becoming the Gordon Day School. From then onward, the Anglican Church provided chaplaincy services to the school. Soon after, in 1975, an advisory board was formed for the Residence.

In 1996, Gordon Student Residence was closed and the main building was razed, making it the last federally-funded residential school in Canada. (The last of all residential schools to close in Canada was Grollier Hall in 1997, which was not government-run when it closed.)

== Demographic ==
Apart from the local children from the George Gordon Reserve, students were drawn from the greater area in Saskatchewan as well, often being the overflow from other residential schools. Overflow was especially evident as a result of the Baby Boom generation, with the year 1965 seeing children coming from such places as Churchill and Split Lake, Manitoba, in the east; Carlyle and Broadview in the south; and Battleford and Pelican Narrows in the north.

Of those children, 90% were Cree, 8% Salteaux, and 1% each were Assiniboine and Chipewyan.

== Abuse ==
The residential school system was part of continuing efforts by the Canadian and American governments towards indigenous cultural genocide through the facilitation and funding of deliberate, violent destruction of children's Indigenous culture, language, and religion, with full knowledge and intentions to do so.

Children attending Gordon Indian Residential School suffered many forms of abuse, inflicting severe damage to the Gordon community. The school has been proven to have inflicted abuse on children under their care. The federal government knew of these abuses and did nothing to stop them, and has since apologized and paid compensation to the victims after being brought to court. The extent of the damage done to these communities, however, is still 'unknown'.

During the mid-1990s, the federal government settled the claims of over 200 abuse complainants from Gordon, while others were awarded sums after successfully suing the government. The George Gordon band was named by the federal Department of Justice as a co-defendant in three abuse lawsuits. The Canadian government maintains that, from 1975 until the closure of the Gordon school in 1996, the band had an advisory board in place that was responsible for administering the school—and by implication, was probably aware of what was happening. Some Gordon victims agree: "We have leadership that has gone through this system and now they want to cover it up.… They could have stopped it. But our bands were not there for us then and they don't give a rat's ass about us now."

On the reserve today, the Gordon Recovery and Wellness Centre provides services and support to the victims of the abuse that occurred during the residential school system.

=== William Starr ===
In particular, William Starr, the administrator of the school residence from 1968 to 1984, is regarded as the worst offender, sexually abusing boys during his near-20-year leadership at the school. He eventually admitted to sexually abusing many boys, possibly hundreds. Since the school's closure, hundreds of lawsuits were filed that detailed allegations of sexual abuse by Starr and others.

In 1993, Starr was sentenced to 4.5 years in prison for sexually assaulting 10 boys during his time as head of the residence. (Later that year, he was sentenced for five counts of sexual assault that took place when he was working with boys at a sea cadet program in New Brunswick.) Out of the 230 Gordon School plaintiffs who received a federal settlement, all claimed to have been abused by Starr.

=== Native workers ===
Many former Gordon students have also said that many Indigenous workers at the school knew of William Starr's conduct, but rather than stopping it, they would accuse students of lying or humiliate them, and even call students "fag" and "Starr's baby." Others victims remember being physically and sexually abused by Indigenous staffers themselves. Tony Merchant, a Regina lawyer whose firm has handled thousands of residential-school lawsuits, claims that about 25% of his cases involve alleged Indigenous abusers.

Some such abusers have also appeared in court, such as William Strongeagle, a former judo instructor at the school. In 1993, Strongeagle was convicted of sexually assaulting an 18-year-old former Gordon student, Betty Nippi (now a member of the Saskatchewan NDP), while his wife watched, in May 1988. He received a year on probation and a CA$735 fine.

Melvin McNab, an Indigenous worker at Gordon, was successfully sued by victims who were assaulted in 1986 and 1987 for $65,000 in damages. The government of Canada was found to be liable in that case.

Another Indigenous child-care worker at Gordon, Greg Bratushesky, was sued for physical abuse. During his time at the school, Bratushesky was officially reprimanded on a number of occasions by the federal Department of Indian Affairs for brutality.

Nonetheless, the residential school system itself is by-and-large blamed for begetting such abusers in the first place. At least two Gordon victims blame Starr, who is claimed to have taught the boys to have sex with one another: "The weaker ones were the sexual prey to the stronger ones.… They were like the ladies of the dorm. We were groomed to be sexual offenders."
