= Eneli Kutter =

Estonian footballer

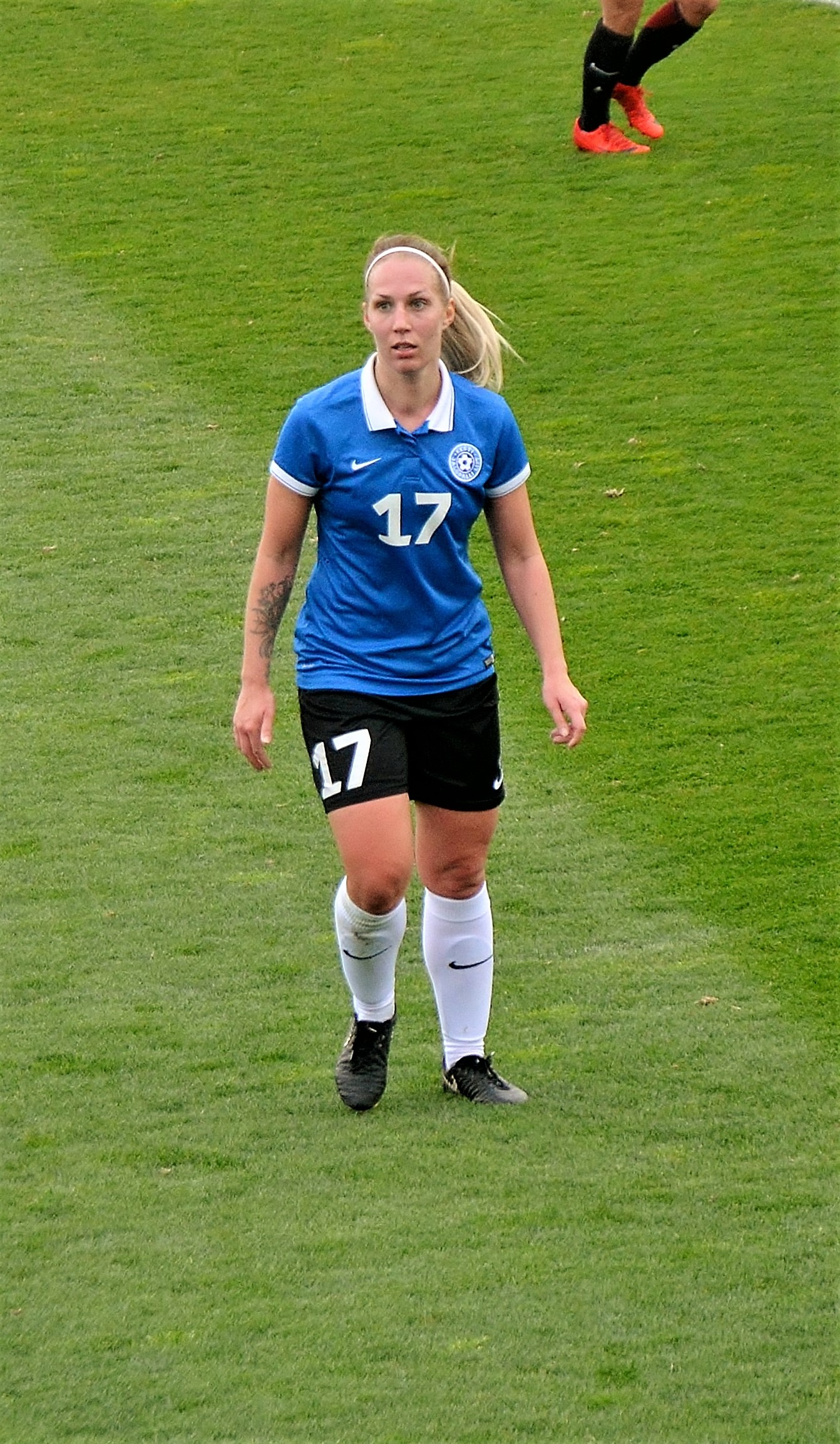
- Eneli Kutter playing Estonia national in 2018.

Personal information
- Full name: Eneli Kutter
- Date of birth: 27 May 1991 (age 35)
- Place of birth: Peri, Estonia
- Position: Midfielder

Team information
- Current team: Jalgpalliklubi Poseidon
- Number: 23

Youth career
- Lootos Põlva

Senior career*
| Years | Team | Apps | (Gls) |
| 2008–2010 | Lootos Põlva | 54 | (33) |
| 2011–2013 | Tammeka Tartu | | |
| 2014–2018 | Flora | | |
| 2020–2021 | Pärnu Vaprus | 26 | (4) |
| 2025– | Poseidon | 1 | (0) |

International career
| 2009 | Estonia U19 | 5 | (1) |
| 2008–2019 | Estonia | 61 | (2) |
- * Club domestic league appearances and goals as of 10 May 2025

Eneli Kutter (née Vals; born 27 May 1991) is an Estonian footballer, who plays as a midfielder for Naiste II liiga club JK Poseidon.

== International career ==
Kutter made her debut for the Estonia women's national football team on 12 November 2008 against Macedonia, coming off the bench and scoring once in the game that ended in a 1–1 draw.
