= Biochemical pharmacology =

Biochemical pharmacology can be:

- Pharmacology, the branch of medicine and biology concerned with the study of drug action
- Biochemical Pharmacology (journal), a peer-reviewed medical journal published by Elsevier
