= Mary Longman =

Canadian artist

- Born: 1964 (age 61–62); Fort Qu'Appelle, Saskatchewan
- Education: Emily Carr Institute of Art and Design, Nova Scotia College of Art and Design, University of Victoria
- Website: http://www.marylongman.com/

Mary Longman (born 1964 in Fort Qu'Appelle, Saskatchewan) is a Canadian artist. She is of Saulteaux heritage from the Gordon First Nation. Her Aboriginal name is Aski-Piyesiwiskwew. She is known for her sculptures, drawings, and paintings, which examine political, cultural, spiritual and environmental issues related to the experiences of Aboriginal people and colonialism, including the Sixties Scoop and residential schools.

== Career ==
Longman is an associate professor in art and art history at the University of Saskatchewan specializing in Aboriginal Art History and sculpture and drawing. Her art has been exhibited in Canadian galleries including the National Gallery of Canada, Museum of Civilization, Vancouver Art Gallery, MacKenzie Art Gallery, Mendel Art Gallery, and McCord Museum. International venues include the Museum of Modern Art, the Smithsonian, and the Hood Museum.

She has stated that she aims to "depict the psychological and social effects these [colonial] views have upon people of First Nations, minority groups and the general public. My Aboriginal ancestry allows me to closely and critically analyze Eurocentric views within my everyday life experiences and to more clearly understand other Aboriginal voices of the past and present. The ultimate goal is to disseminate an awareness of these conditioning effects and hopefully bring about a greatly needed change of thought."

Longman's sculpture Ancestors Rising was commissioned by the MacKenzie Art Gallery in Regina, Saskatchewan, and marks the Saskatchewan centennial as well as a First Nations presence in Regina's sculptural landscape. On National Aboriginal Day, 21 June 2006, this sculpture was unveiled in front of the MacKenzie Art Gallery in Wascana Park.

Her family experiences have influenced her work. Longman's mother was born in 1949 and was put in residential school as a child. The digital art work titled Warrior Woman: Stop the Silence!! was created in response to her mother's experiences.

Longman was a recipient of the Distinguished Alumni award from the Emily Carr Institute of Art and Design (2000), Lieutenant Governor Award finalist in the Saskatchewan Artist Award category (2012) and the Provost Teaching Excellence Award in Aboriginal Education (2015).

== Exhibitions ==
Selected Solo Exhibitions

- 2016 - Sâkêwêwak Artists' Collective, Regina, Saskatchewan, Warrior women & selected works
- 2004 – Makenzie Art Gallery, Regina, Saskatchewan, Mary Longman
- 2000 – Thunder Bay Art Gallery, Thunder Bay, Ontario, Blood and Stones
- 1999 – Dunlop Art Gallery, Regina, Saskatchewan, Saskdiaspora
- Waneuskwewin Gallery, Saskatoon, Saskatchewan, Blood and Stones
- 1996 – Kamloops Art Gallery, Kamloops, British Columbia, Traces
- 1995 – Neutral Ground, Regina, Saskatchewan, Coming Home
- 1988 – Emily Carr Institute of Art and Design, Vancouver, British Columbia, Wolves in Sheep's Clothing

== Sources ==
- Dales, Jennifer. (2010-01-10). "Landmarks of time and place: The art of Mary Longman" Rabble.ca. Retrieved 2016-02-28.
- "Mary Longman" University of Saskatchewan College of Arts & Sciences. Retrieved 2016-02-28.
- "Mary Longman" Aboriginal Curatorial Collective (ACC). Retrieved 2016-02-28.
- "Dr. Mary Longman MFA ‘93" NSCAD University Alumni & Friends. Retrieved 2016-02-28.
- Mary Longman: Transposing Perspectives Mendel Art Gallery, 2011 ISBN 978-1-896359-75-5
