= Joseph Schlenoff =

Dr. Joseph B. Schlenoff is a distinguished research professor and Leo Mandelkern Professor of Polymer Science of the department of chemistry and biochemistry at Florida State University. He graduated with his doctorate in chemistry from UMass-Amherst in 1987 and became a professor at Florida State University in 1988. A leading scientist in the field of water-soluble polymers and biocompatible polymer composites and blends, Dr. Schlenoff has discovered a process for creating biomaterials that can be used in surgical implants designed for the extended release of certain medications and holds 30 issued and many pending patents. This number of issued patents places him second among faculty at Florida State University behind only Robert A. Holton. He is the founder of the start-up, nanoStrata, a company that manufactures novel robots to create biofilms. Dr. Schlenoff was one of three researchers from around the world awarded a Gutenberg Chair for 2011 at the Université de Strasbourg in France. In 2013, Dr. Schlenoff was awarded the Florida Award from the American Chemical Society.
