= Judy Anderson =

Canadian Cree artist

- Born: Gordon First Nation, Saskatchewan
- Known for: beadwork, painting, installation art

Judy Anderson is a Nêhiyaw Cree artist from the Gordon First Nation in Saskatchewan, Canada, which is a Treaty 4 territory. Anderson is currently an Associate Professor of Canadian Indigenous Studio Art in the Department of Arts at the University of Calgary. Her artwork focuses on issues of spirituality, colonialism, family, and Indigeneity and she uses in her practice hand-made paper, beadwork, painting, and does collaborative projects, such as the ongoing collaboration with her son Cruz, where the pair combine traditional Indigenous methodologies and graffiti. Anderson has also been researching traditional European methods and materials of painting.

== Career ==
She holds a BA and a BFA from the University of Saskatchewan and an MFA from the University of Regina. Anderson was a faculty member at the First Nations University of Canada and the University of Regina. She was hired in 2017 by the University of Calgary to teach Studio and Indigenous Art History.

Anderson was the Founding director of Platteforum in 2002, a non profit arts organization geared toward educating the youth

Anderson works in painting, beadwork, augmented reality, and installation art. She focuses on issues of spirituality, family, graffiti and popular representations of Aboriginal people, all of which are created with the purpose of honoring the people in her life. Her work has been included in national projects remembering missing and murdered Indigenous women in Canada.

She and her son Cruz Anderson work on glass beaded graffiti art on moose hide. The pair collaborated on a piece which honored Anderson's grandmother who was murdered when Judy was 12. Her pieces shed light on murdered and missing Indigenous peoples and was featured in an exhibit called "Walking with our Sisters" in 2013.

In 2014, Anderson was invited to teach at The Prince's School of Traditional Arts in London, England where she taught Prince Charles how to sew beads and porcupine quills on a moose hide.

Anderson's work is represented in the permanent collection of the National Gallery of Canada.

== Exhibitions ==
- Critical Faculties (Plain Red Gallery, First Nations University of Canada) 2012
- The Synthetic Age (MacKenzie Art Gallery) 2013
- Walking With Our Sisters (Plain Red Gallery, First Nations University of Canada) 2013
- The Sole Project (The Art Gallery of Regina) 2016
- Bead Speak (Slate Fine Art Gallery) 2016
- Working Mom (Last Mountain Lake Gallery) 2017
- Beading Now (La Guilde) 2019
- Bead Speak 2.0 (Slate Gallery) 2020
- BACA (Biennale d’art contemporain autochtone / Contemporary Native Art Biennial): Honouring Kinship (Art Mûr) 2020
- Biennial of Contemporary Art (Remai Modern) 2020
- The Radical Stitch (Mackenzie Art Gallery) 2022

== Awards ==
In 2016 Anderson received the Denver Art Museum Gold Key Award, awarded to only those who have made significant contributions to contemporary art in Colorado

In 2017, Anderson won the National Salt Spring Award
