= Punnichy =

Village in Saskatchewan, Canada

- Village
- Location of Punnichy in Saskatchewan Punnichy (Canada)
- Coordinates: 51.372°N 104.293°W
- Country: Canada
- Province: Saskatchewan
- Census division: 6
- Rural Municipality: Mount Hope No. 279
- Post office: 1909-04-01
- Incorporated (Village): 1909

Government
  - Mayor: Victor Senft
  - Administrator: Dixie-Lee Cowan
  - Governing body: Punnichy Village Council

Area
  - Total: 0.68 km^{2} (0.26 sq mi)
- Elevation: 610 m (2,000 ft)

Population (2011)
  - Total: 245
  - Density: 363.3/km^{2} (941/sq mi)
- Time zone: UTC−6 (CST)
- Postal code: S0A 3C0
- Area code: 306
- Highways: Highway 15
- Railways: Canadian National Railway

Punnichy /ˈpʌnɪtʃaɪ/ (2016 population: 213) is a village in the Canadian province of Saskatchewan within the Rural Municipality of Mount Hope No. 279 and Census Division No. 10. It is 126 kilometres (78 mi) northeast of the city of Regina. This village is part of the original "Alphabet Line" of the main Canadian National Railway line with Lestock to the east and Quinton to the west (the M, N, O towns have long since been deserted). Punnichy derived its name from panacay, "fledgling bird with few feathers", a Saulteaux joke referring to the appearance of a pioneer merchant.

Punnichy is along Highway 15 in the heart of the Touchwood Hills between Quinton and Lestock. It is surrounded by four First Nation reserves: Muskowekwan, Kawacatoose, Day Star, and Gordon. Punnichy was the location of one of the last operating residential schools in Canada, Gordon Indian Residential School, which closed in 1996.

Punnichy is part of the provincial constituency Last Mountain-Touchwood and federal constituency Regina—Qu'Appelle.

== History ==
Punnichy incorporated as a village on October 22, 1909.

== Demographics ==
Population history (1981–2016)
Year	Pop.	±%
1981	394	—
1986	388	−1.5%
1991	365	−5.9%
1996	338	−7.4%
2001	317	−6.2%
2006	277	−12.6%
2011	246	−11.2%
2016	213	−13.4%
Source: Statistics Canada via Saskatchewan Bureau of Statistics

In the 2021 Census of Population conducted by Statistics Canada, Punnichy had a population of 212 living in 79 of its 87 total private dwellings, a change of −0.5% from its 2016 population of 213. With a land area of 0.68 km^{2} (0.26 sq mi), it had a population density of 311.8/km^{2} (807.5/sq mi) in 2021.

In the 2016 Census of Population, the Village of Punnichy recorded a population of 213 living in 83 of its 117 total private dwellings, a −15.5% change from its 2011 population of 246. With a land area of 0.68 km^{2} (0.26 sq mi), it had a population density of 313.2/km^{2} (811.3/sq mi) in 2016.

== Education ==
Punnichy has an elementary school, high school, and a Carlton Trail Regional College centre.

Punnichy Community High School is unique within the Horizon School Division, in that it is run on the quadmester system, with four terms in a school year. The students take four classes in the first quadamester, two each morning, and another two each afternoon. The first quadmester lasts 90 school days and the remaining 3 each last about 35 days. In the last 3 quadmesters, students take one class all morning and another all afternoon.

A satellite facility of Punnichy high school is the George Gordon Computer Education Centre in the community centre on Gordon First Nation. The facility assists First Nations students to return to school or pick up extra classes to move into post-secondary or job training. The program is "at your own pace" and is similar to "store front" programs in urban centres.

Gordon's Indian Residential School, located in Punnichy and which closed its doors in 1996, was one of the last federally-funded residential school in Canada.

== Notable people ==
- Nolan Yonkman, a defenceman for the Florida Panthers, was born in Punnichy
- Jim Sinclair, Indigenous political leader
- Jeffery Straker, singer

== See also ==
- List of communities in Saskatchewan
- List of francophone communities in Saskatchewan
- List of villages in Saskatchewan
