= Lynn Gehl =

Algonquin author and activist (born 1962)

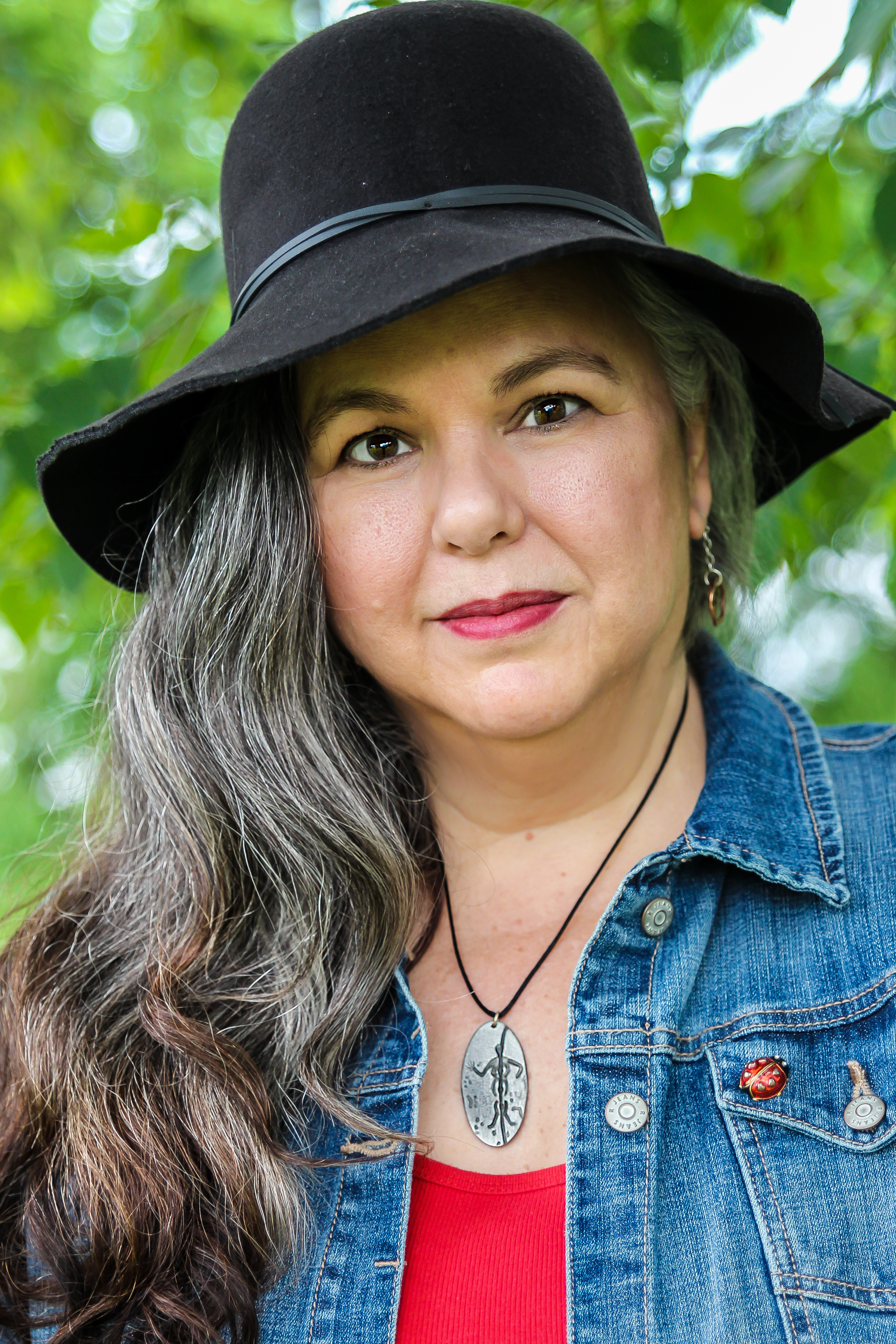
- Born: 1962 (age 63–64); Toronto, Ontario, Canada
- Occupations: Author, human rights activist

Lynn Gehl is an Algonquin Anishinaabe-kwe from the Ottawa River Valley, Ontario, Canada. She is a writer, blogger and Indigenous human rights advocate. Gehl was involved in legal challenges aimed at eliminating the continued sex discrimination in the Indian Act, which withheld or removed legal Indian status from some Indigenous women and matrilineally descended Indigenous people. She is also an outspoken critic of the contemporary land claims and self-government process, as well as Indigenous issues in Canada. In April 2017, Gehl was successful in defeating Indian and Northern Affairs Canada's unstated paternity policy when the Court of Appeal for Ontario ruled the sex discrimination in the policy was unreasonable.

== Early life and education ==
Lynn was born and raised in Toronto, Ontario. Her grandmother was from Golden Lake First Nation. She studied chemical technology at Humber College of Applied Arts and Technology and worked for more than a decade monitoring Ontario's waterways for toxic organic pollutants. She left and returned to school, studying anthropology at York University and later completed a masters and PhD in Indigenous Studies. She transformed her doctoral dissertation into a book titled "The Truth that Wampum Tells: My Debwewin on the Algonquin Land Claims Process" (2014).

== Sex discrimination under the Indian Act ==
Because Gehl did not know her grandfather's paternity (her father's father), she was denied Indian status registration and consequently denied band membership. This led to her developing a legal case to fight sex discrimination under the Indian Act. In the course of this effort, Gehl discovered that INAC had an unknown paternity policy, wherein Indian women who had children where a father could not be named on the birth certificate, the children would not be eligible for full Indian status or they would be denied Indian status. On April 20, 2017, the Ontario Court of Appeal granted Gehl the right to register as an "Indian" under the Indian Act. But in the end, she was only awarded Indian status under 6(2), rather than 6(1)a, which would allow her to pass down her status to her descendants.

In 2019, Gehl, along with other Indigenous women, launched a "6(1)a All the Way!" campaign to lobby the federal government to eliminate residual sex-based discrimination within the Indian Act. They were successful, and Lynn was "upgraded" to 6(1)a Indian status.

== Peer Reviewed Book Publications ==
- Gehl v Canada: Challenging Sex Discrimination in the Indian Act (2021)
- Claiming Anishinaabe: Decolonizing the Human Spirit (2017)
- The Truth that Wampum Tells: My Debwewin on the Algonquin Land Claims Process (2014)
- Mkadengwe: Sharing Canada's Colonial Process through Black Face Methodology (2014)
- Anishinaabeg Stories: Featuring Petroglyphs, Petrographs, and Wampum Belts (2012)

== Awards ==
- Reconcili-Action Award from CRRC of Peterborough (2023)
- Governor General's Award in Commemoration of the Persons Case (2022)
- K-Y Canada International Women’s Day campaign winner (2021)
- Nominated for the YMCA Peace Medal (2019)
- Nominated for the YMCA Peace Medal (2017)
- Social Sciences and Humanities Research Council of Canada Award (2007/08)
- Social Sciences and Humanities Research Council of Canada Award (2006/07)
- Social Sciences and Humanities Research Council of Canada Award (2005/06)
- Native Studies Research Fellowship (2005)
- United Steel Workers of America Scholarship (2005)
- Native Studies Research Fellowship (2004)
- Dean’s Scholarship (2004)
- Quaker Oats Company of Canada Limited Graduate Scholarship (2004)
- Ontario Graduate Scholarship (2004/05)
- Morton Graduate Scholarship in Native Studies (2004)
- Ontario Graduate Scholarship (2003/04)
- Ontario Graduate Scholarship (2002/03)
- Leslie Frost Endowment Entrance Scholarship (2002/03)
- Bachelor of Arts with Honours (summa cum laude), York University, Socio-Cultural Anthropology (2002)
- Allen T. Lambert Scholars Award York University (2002)
- Nicol, Vince, & Wensley Book Prize in Anthropology York University (1999-2001)
- York Faculty of Arts Sessional Academic Achievement (1997-2001)
- York University Continuing Education Award (1997-2000)

== Book Awards ==
- 2018 For Claiming Anishinaabe: Decolonizing the Human Spirit. Ministry of Parks, Culture and Sport Publishing Award winner. 25th Saskatchewan Book Awards.
- 2018 For Claiming Anishinaabe: Decolonizing the Human Spirit. The Saskatoon Public Library Indigenous Peoples’ Publishing Award nominee. 25th Saskatchewan Book Awards.
- 2017 For Claiming Anishinaabe: Decolonizing the Human Spirit. The Hill Times’ List of 100 Best Books of 2017.
- 2017 For Claiming Anishinaabe: Decolonizing the Human Spirit. Foreword Reviews 2017 Indies finalist – Body, Mind & Spirit (Adult Nonfiction).

== Selected Magazine/Newspaper Publications ==
For more than 30 years Lynn has published in several reputable online magazines and newspapers including:

- The Canadian Encyclopedia https://www.thecanadianencyclopedia.ca/en/article/land-acknowledgment
- Policy Options https://policyoptions.irpp.org/magazines/june-2024/canada-indigenous-identity/
- Briarpatch https://briarpatchmagazine.com/articles/view/seven-key-learnings-from-the-mmiwg-legal-analysis-on-genocide
- Watershed Sentinel https://watershedsentinel.ca/articles/akikodjiwan/
- Canada’s History http://www.canadashistory.ca/Explore/First-Nations,-Inuit-Metis/Fighting-for-Recognition
- Anishinabek News https://anishinabeknews.ca/2016/03/13/sex-discrimination-in-the-indian-act-addressed-again-descheneaux-and-yantha/
- rabble http://rabble.ca/news/2016/02/indigenous-women-and-girls-disabilities-bigger-targets-sexual-violence
- Feminist Wire https://thefeministwire.com/2013/04/clearing-the-path-for-the-turtle/
- Muskrat Magazine https://muskratmagazine.com/indigenous-knowledge-where-is-it-and-does-it-always-make-a-sound/
