= Sharon McIvor =

Sharon Donna Mclvor (born October 9, 1948) is a leading Aboriginal women's rights activist, a member of the Lower Nicola Band and is a Thompson Indian. She challenged the government of Canada in a landmark case regarding sex-based discrimination among Indigenous women and children. She recognized through her roles in advocacy, where she stresses the importance of Aboriginal Rights.

== Early life and education ==
Sharon McIvor was born in Merritt, British Columbia, Canada. She studied at the University of Victoria and Queen's University where she has acquired two degrees, an LL.B. and LL.M. in 1987 and 1995.

== Activism ==
McIvor has been a strong supporter for missing and murdered Indigenous women, including children and has emphasized the importance of such societal issues by addressing the seriousness of this on-going battle. McIvor is also an advocate for NWAC, also referred to the Native Women's Association of Canada. She persistently challenged the government of Canada on numerous accounts regarding sex-based discrimination among Indigenous women and children.

More specifically, she shed light on the issue of disenfranchisement and the difficulty it has when obtaining status for the offspring of couples who were victims of this form of identity loss. To expand, this consists of an Indigenous woman who marries a non-Indigenous man, resulting in a loss of status. When Sharon McIvor applied to obtain her status, and by extension of her children as well, she was denied due to the policies under the Indian Act.

By being a representative of the Indigenous population who empowers her community through acts of kinship, the deconstruction of colonization and discrimination is prevalent in her attempts to remove sexist undertones from legislation in order to ensure gender equality. Continuing her path of perseverance by overcoming adversity that has been implemented by the government through restrictive and limited policies such as the Indian Act (Bill C-31), McIvor continues to address an array of concerns which inevitably results in deleterious effects for many generations of Indigenous people.

McIvor is known for focusing on topics such as systemic discrimination within Bill-C31 (The Indian Act), while shedding light on the lengthy process of the court proceedings that she was extensively involved in. Her ability to continue persevering through the courts lengthy proceeding shows how dedicated she is when advocating Indigenous Rights. Spreading awareness of the colonialism that has impacted those who identify as Indigenous for so many years is imperative when rectifying policies and legislation that enforce effects in a discriminatory manner.

She has served as Co-chair of the Feminist Alliance for International Action (FAFIA-AFAI). Sharon spoke at the United Nations for Equality Rights & Indigenous Rights in 2016 representing FAFIA-AFAI.

She has sat on multiple panels for "Justice Bertha Wilson's Panel on Gender Justice in the Legal Profession", "Equality Rights Panel of the Court Challenges Program" and "Aboriginal Circle of the Canadian Panel on Violence Against Women".

== Career ==
McIvor is currently employed by the Nicola Valley Institute of Technology in Merritt, British Columbia, which specializes in post-secondary education for those who identify as Indigenous. She has been contributing information to an array of departments within her workplace including the criminology department, Indigenous Academic Studies, and University transfers. She teaches about history, politics, colonization, and human rights to aboriginal students.

== Marriage and family ==
Both of McIvor's parents were born out of wedlock to Indigenous women and non-Indigenous men. Her father, Ernest McIvor, was born out of wedlock to Alex McIvor (referred to be non-Indigenous) and Cecelia McIvor (who should be entitled to status). Her mother, Susan Blankenship, was born out of wedlock to Jacob Blankenship (identified as non-Indigenous) and Mary Tom (identified as Indigenous).

McIvor's husband, Charles Terry Grismer is identified as non-Indigenous. Their children (Jacob, Jordana and Jaime Grismer) are involved in her landmark legal cases to obtain status.

== Honours ==
She received Caron Geller award in 2007. In 2011, she received the Governor General's Award in Commemoration of the Persons Case.

Sharon's work has been honoured by Canada's Feminist Alliance for International Action as a member of the Indigenous Famous Six.
