= Estonian Society of Human Genetics =

Organization based in Estonia

- Formation: 1999
- Type: Non-profit educational society
- Purpose: Foster genetics research
- Location: Tartu, Estonia
- Region served: Estonia
- President: Andres Metspalu
- Website: www.estshg.ebc.ee

The Estonian Society of Human Genetics (ESTSHG) (Estonian: Eesti Inimesegeneetika Ühing) is a non-profit organization that promotes research and communication between scientists involved in human and medical genetics.

== Functions ==
The Estonian Society of Human Genetics was founded in 1999. It organizes educational events related to biotechnology, and specifically the study of genetics in Estonia. As of 2012, the society had about 87 members. The Estonian Society of Human Genetics is associated with the Estonian Academy of Sciences. It is also associated with the European Society of Human Genetics (ESHG).

== Board ==
As of 2012, the President was Andres Metspalu. Metspalu is a past President of the European Society of Human Genetics. The Board as of 2012 was:

- Professor Andres Metspalu, President, Institute of Molecular and Cell Biology, University Genome Center, Estonian Biocentre
- Professor Aavo-Valdur Mikelsaar TÜ, Faculty of Medicine
- Professor Ants Kurg, TÜ Institute of Molecular and Cell Biology
- Doctor Riin Tamm, TÜ Institute of Molecular and Cell Biology, TÜ Genome
- Doctor Tiia Reimand, SA TÜ Clinics, United Laboratory of Genetics
- Professor Andres Veske, TTÜ Institute of Genetic Engineering
