= George Gordon First Nation =

First Nation in Saskatchewan

Coordinates: 51°15′51″N 104°17′19″W

- Band No. 391
- People: Cree and Saulteaux
- Treaty: Treaty 4
- Headquarters: Punnichy
- Province: Saskatchewan

Land
- Main reserve: Gordon 86
- Reserve: Last Mountain Lake 80A
- Land area: 150.757 km^{2} (58.208 sq mi)

Population (2019)
- On reserve: 1191
- Off reserve: 2561
- Total population: 3752

Government
- Chief: Shawn Longman

Tribal Council
- Touchwood Agency Tribal Council

The George Gordon First Nation (Cree: ᐳᓵᑲᓇᒌᕽ posâkanacîhk) is a First Nations band government located near the village of Punnichy, Saskatchewan, in Canada. The nation has an enrolled population of 3,752 people, 1,191 of whom live on the band's reserves. Their territory is located on the Gordon 86 reserve, as arranged by Treaty 4.

== History ==
In 1874, Treaty 4, which brokered the sale of indigenous land to the British Crown, was established between Queen Victoria and the Cree and Saulteaux First Nations. On September 15 of the same year, Kaneonuskatew (or, in his English name of George Gordon) was among the first of the Indigenous leaders to make the agreement, signing as Chief of the George Gordon First Nation. By 1884, half of the families belonging to the nation were farming, a development which had commenced in 1876, and would continue for many years. Although both George Gordon and his son, Moses Gordon, were originally hereditary chiefs, the people have since adopted the practice of democratically voting their chiefs and councillors into office.

The George Gordon First Nation was the location of Gordon Indian Residential School, the longest-running residential school in Canada. The Anglican Church of Canada established a day school on Gordon’s Reserve in 1876. It was expanded in 1888 to provide housing to students attending the school. In 1929 the school was destroyed by fire and eventually rebuilt. Problems with water supply and maintenance led to its being closed for much of the time between 1947 and 1953. The school was closed in 1996. Children attending Gordon Indian Residential School were reported to have suffered various forms of abuse, inflicting severe damage to the Gordon community. The schools have been proven to have facilitated the abuse of children under their care. The federal government knew of these abuses, and has since apologized and paid compensation to the victims. The extent of the damage done to these communities is still yet known. The residential school system is widely regarded as cultural genocide, due to the action of destroying Indigenous culture, language, and religion, as well as the intent to do so. On the reserve, the Gordon Recovery and Wellness Centre provides services and support to the victims of the abuse that occurred during the Residential School System.

== Reserves ==
Their reserves include:

- George Gordon First Nation 86
- Gordon 86
- Last Mountain Lake 80A
- Treaty Four Reserve Grounds 77, shared with 32 other bands.

== Programs and services ==
The George Gordon First Nation boasts a modern medical clinic, an education centre, a computer centre, an arena and a day care, as well as the Gordon Retail Centre and the Buffalo Ranch Project. Programs that are offered to band members include the Residential School Recovery and Wellness Centre, Brighter Futures, and Gordon Social Development. Other community infrastructures include a band office, pre-fab plant, fire hall, teachers centre, gymnasium, warehouse, water treatment plant, and machine shed.

== Notable people ==
- Judy Anderson, artist
- Lillian Dyck, Canadian senator from Saskatchewan
- Mary Longman, visual artist
- Edward Poitras, artist
- Arielle Twist, poet
- Kenneth T. Williams, playwright, professor

== See also ==
- First Nations in Saskatchewan.
