= George Gordon First Nation 86 =

Indian reserve in Saskatchewan, Canada

Coordinates: 52°08′11″N 102°12′53″W

- Indian reserve
- George Gordon First Nation Indian Reserve No. 86
- Location in Saskatchewan
- First Nation: George Gordon
- Country: Canada
- Province: Saskatchewan

Area
  - Total: 129.2 ha (319 acres)

George Gordon First Nation 86 is an uninhabited Indian reserve of the George Gordon First Nation in Saskatchewan.

== See also ==
- List of Indian reserves in Saskatchewan
