= Café Daughter =

2023 Canadian drama film

- Directed by: Shelley Niro
- Written by: Shelley Niro; Kenneth T. Williams
- Based on: Café Daughter by Kenneth T. Williams
- Produced by: Floyd Kane; Amos Adetuyi
- Starring: Violah Beauvais; Star Slade; Sera-Lys McArthur; Billy Merasty
- Music by: ElizaBeth Hill
- Production companies: Freddie Films; Circle Blue Entertainment
- Release date: June 17, 2023
- Running time: 97 minutes
- Country: Canada
- Language: English

Café Daughter is a 2023 Canadian drama film, directed by Shelley Niro. Adapted from Kenneth T. Williams's stage play of the same name, which was itself a fictionalized account of the life of Canadian physician and senator Lillian Dyck, the film stars Violah Beauvais as Yvette Wong, a young girl of mixed Cree and Chinese Canadian ancestry growing up in Saskatchewan in the 1960s, who faces challenges after the death of her mother but remains focused on her goal of attending medical school to become a doctor.

The cast also includes Star Slade, Tom Lim, Sera-Lys McArthur, Evan Lau, Billy Merasty, Blair Lamora and Demaris Moon Walker.

The film was shot in Sudbury, Ontario, in 2022.

== Distribution ==
The film premiered on June 17, 2023, at a retrospective of Niro's work staged at the National Museum of the American Indian's George Gustav Heye Center in New York City. It had its Canadian premiere in the Cinema Indigenized lineup at the 2023 Cinéfest Sudbury International Film Festival.

== Awards ==
It won the Audience Choice Award at the 2023 imagineNATIVE Film and Media Arts Festival.
