= Nolan Yonkman =

Canadian ice hockey player

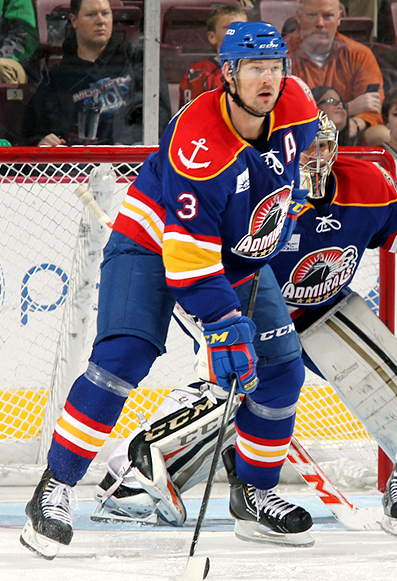
- Yonkman with the Norfolk Admirals in 2013
- Born: April 1, 1981 (age 45) Punnichy, Saskatchewan, Canada
- Height: 6 ft 6 in (198 cm)
- Weight: 247 lb (112 kg; 17 st 9 lb)
- Position: Defence
- Shot: Right
- Played for: Washington Capitals; Phoenix Coyotes; Florida Panthers; Anaheim Ducks; JYP Jyväskylä
- NHL draft: 37th overall, 1999; Washington Capitals
- Playing career: 2001–2019

Nolan Yonkman (born April 1, 1981) is a Canadian former professional ice hockey defenceman who played in the National Hockey League (NHL) before concluding his career with JYP of the Finnish Liiga.

== Career ==
Yonkman played major junior in the Western Hockey League (WHL) with the Kelowna Rockets and Brandon Wheat Kings. He was drafted 37th overall by the Washington Capitals in the 1999 NHL entry draft and made his National Hockey League (NHL) debut in 2001–02. Yonkman played the majority of his time with the Capitals' organization with their American Hockey League (AHL) affiliate, the Portland Pirates.

On July 17, 2006, Yonkman signed as a free agent with the Nashville Predators and played for their AHL affiliate, the Milwaukee Admirals, for three seasons. On July 13, 2009, he was re-signed by the Predators to a one-year contract.

After four seasons with the Admirals, Yonkman then signed a one-year contract with the Phoenix Coyotes on July 3, 2010. Yonkman played for their affiliate, the San Antonio Rampage. Yonkman remained as captain with the Rampage when their affiliation was changed from the Coyotes to the Florida Panthers by signing a two-year deal with the Panthers' organization on July 1, 2011. Over the course of his contract, he appeared in eight games for Florida as a reserve defenseman.

On July 7, 2013, Yonkman signed a one-year, two-way contract as a free agent with the Anaheim Ducks.

As a free agent following his season with the Ducks, Yonkman was unable to earn an NHL contract but was invited to the Calgary Flames training camp on September 18, 2014. Following his release from Calgary, Yonkman signed a one-year AHL contract with Flames' affiliate, the Adirondack Flames, on October 7, 2014.

On May 18, 2015, Yonkman headed overseas, signing a one-year contract with Finnish Liiga club JYP.

Following the 2018–19 season, his fourth season with JYP in the Liiga, Yonkman ended his 18-year professional career. He returned to North America, taking a job with junior club Milwaukee Power of the North American 3 Hockey League (NA3HL) as a player development consultant, and providing color commentary for My 24 television broadcasts of Admirals games. In 2021, he was hired by the Minnesota Wild to be an assistant coach with their AHL affiliate, the Iowa Wild.

== Career statistics ==
			Regular season						Playoffs
Season	Team	League	GP	G	A	Pts	+/-	PIM	GP	G	A	Pts	+/-	PIM
1996–97	Kelowna Rockets	WHL	4	0	0	0	-3	0	—	—	—	—	—	—
1997–98	Kelowna Rockets	WHL	65	0	2	2	-9	36	7	0	0	0	-1	2
1998–99	Kelowna Rockets	WHL	61	1	6	7	-33	129	6	0	0	0	-2	6
1999–00	Kelowna Rockets	WHL	71	5	7	12	-30	153	5	0	0	0	-2	8
2000–01	Kelowna Rockets	WHL	7	0	1	1	-6	19	—	—	—	—	—	—
2000–01	Brandon Wheat Kings	WHL	51	6	10	16	7	94	6	0	1	1	-1	12
2001–02	Washington Capitals	NHL	11	1	0	1	3	4	—	—	—	—	—	—
2001–02	Portland Pirates	AHL	59	4	3	7	0	116	—	—	—	—	—	—
2002–03	Portland Pirates	AHL	24	1	4	5	4	40	3	0	1	1	-1	2
2003–04	Portland Pirates	AHL	4	0	0	3	0	11	—	—	—	—	—	—
2003–04	Washington Capitals	NHL	1	0	0	0	0	0	—	—	—	—	—	—	—
2004–05	Portland Pirates	AHL	32	0	3	3	-6	68	—	—	—	—	—	—
2005–06	Washington Capitals	NHL	38	0	7	7	1	86	—	—	—	—	—	—
2005–06	Hershey Bears	AHL	6	0	0	0	-1	15	—	—	—	—	—	—
2006–07	Milwaukee Admirals	AHL	77	3	10	13	-17	113	4	0	0	0	-1	2
2007–08	Milwaukee Admirals	AHL	69	0	7	7	0	103	6	0	1	1	1	18
2008–09	Milwaukee Admirals	AHL	61	3	7	10	7	80	11	0	0	0	5	15
2009–10	Milwaukee Admirals	AHL	76	2	7	9	4	170	7	0	1	1	-2	2
2010–11	San Antonio Rampage	AHL	56	1	4	5	-9	104	—	—	—	—	—	—
2010–11	Phoenix Coyotes	NHL	16	0	1	1	5	39	—	—	—	—	—	—
2011–12	San Antonio Rampage	AHL	66	2	11	13	19	102	10	0	2	2	0	8
2011–12	Florida Panthers	NHL	1	0	0	0	0	0	—	—	—	—	—	—
2012–13	San Antonio Rampage	AHL	71	0	7	7	-34	93	—	—	—	—	—	—
2012–13	Florida Panthers	NHL	7	0	0	0	-1	11	—	—	—	—	—	—
2013–14	Norfolk Admirals	AHL	67	2	5	7	5	107	8	0	1	1	1	7
2013–14	Anaheim Ducks	NHL	2	0	1	1	-1	0	—	—	—	—	—	—
2014–15	Adirondack Flames	AHL	65	2	10	12	-8	52	—	—	—	—	—	—
2015–16	JYP Jyväskylä	Liiga	57	1	7	8	8	97	13	0	3	3	-1	22
2016–17	JYP Jyväskylä	Liiga	57	0	7	7	4	82	13	0	3	3	-1	0
2017–18	JYP Jyväskylä	Liiga	52	2	1	3	-3	59	5	0	0	0	-1	4
2018–19	JYP Jyväskylä	Liiga	32	0	4	4	-2	64	3	0	1	1	0	2
NHL totals			76	1	9	10	7	140	—	—	—	—	—	—
