= The Indigenous Famous Six =

The Indigenous Famous Six was created by The Feminist Alliance for International Action for the purpose of advocating for Indigenous women's rights. This collective action by six Indigenous women is similar to the collective effort taken by the "Famous Five" that gained Canadian women the right to vote. Collectively the Indigenous Famous Six were active in challenging the sex discrimination in the Indian Act in Canada during the twentieth and twenty-first centuries.

While the first Indigenous woman to speak out nationally and internationally about the sex discrimination in the Indian Act in the 1960s was Mary Two-Axe Earley, the members of the Indigenous Famous Six consisted of six contemporary women who were active in challenging the sex discrimination in the Indian Act either as plaintiffs, international actors and/or proponents at the senate level: Jeannette Corbiere Lavell, Yvonne Bedard, Senator Sandra Lovelace-Nicolas, Sharon McIvor, Dr. Lynn Gehl, and Senator Lillian Dyck.

== Sex discrimination in the Indian Act ==
Through a series of legislative acts dating back to the Gradual Civilization Act (1857), Indian women and their children were enfranchised (determined to no longer be Indians) when their husbands or fathers were enfranchised. It was through the 1869 An Act for the Gradual Enfranchisement of Indians that Indian women, along with their children, who married non-Indian men were enfranchised and denied Indian status registration and subsequently their treaty rights. Eventually the process of eliminating Indians through sex discrimination was codified in section 12(1)b of the 1951 Indian Act.

== Members ==
=== Jeannette Corbiere-Lavell ===
In June 1971 Jeannette Corbiere-Lavell, Anishinaabe from Manitoulin Island in Ontario, took her complaint regarding the sex discrimination in section 12(1)b of the Indian Act, that removed Indian status from Indian women when they married non-Indian men as defined by the Indian Act (the same did not apply to Indian men when they married non-Indian women), to the Ontario County Court. In the fall of 1971, Corbiere-Lavell appealed to the Federal Court. The judges concluded it was not a violation of the guarantee of non-discrimination within The Canadian Bill of Rights.

Corbiere-Lavell has a long history of advocating for Indigenous women and their families. In 1970s she was a founding member of Indian Rights for Indian Women; a founding Member of the Nishnawbe Institute; and a founding member of the Ontario Native Women’s Association (ONWA). More recently she was the president of the Native Women's Association of Canada. In taking on this work she has been the recipient of several awards such as the Persons Award in 2009 from the Governor General of Canada, and the 2020 Indspire Award.

=== Yvonne Bedard ===
In 1971, Yvonne Bedard, Onondaga from Six Nations in Ontario, also filed a complaint in the Ontario High Court regarding the sex discrimination in 12(1)b of the Indian Act. Since the Corbiere-Lavell case had already been heard at the Federal Court of Appeal the two cases, Lavell and Bedard, were joined at the Supreme Court of Canada. The Supreme Court of Canada ruled that Corbiere-Lavell and Bedard had not been discriminated against as Indian women because The Canadian Bill of Rights only guaranteed equality before the law, not equality under the law. Equality before the law was interpreted by the court as meaning equality in the administration or application of the law.

=== Sandra Lovelace ===
It was in 1981 when Senator Sandra Lovelace appealed to the United Nations Human Rights Committee but because her marriage and loss of Indian status registration occurred prior to the International Covenant on Civil and Political Rights the Committee declined to rule on the matter of sex discrimination.

When Canada’s Constitution was patriated in 1982, it included The Charter of Rights and Freedoms where section 15 guarantees the right to live free from sex discrimination. In 1985, the Indian Act was amended through Bill C-31, purportedly to bring it in line with the Charter, whereby many Indigenous women and their descendants were re-instated as status Indians, and their children were registered for the first time. This amendment to the Indian Act, though, created the second generation cut-off rule, and further its implementation created new forms of sex discrimination in that re-instated Indian women and their children born before 1985 now faced a new form of discrimination. While all previous Indian men and their descendants born before 1985 were grandfathered in as 6(1)a Indians, re-instated Indian women were registered as a lesser form, 6(1)c, and their children born before 1985 were registered as 6(2) where their grandchildren also born before 1985 continued to be denied. Through what is now known and the "6(1)a and 6(1)c" hierarchy additional forms of sex discrimination were created, namely the cousins and siblings issues. What is more, it was through the 1985 amendments to the Indian Act where Canada created yet another new form of sex discrimination regarding the matter of unknown and unstated paternity.

=== Sharon Donna McIvor ===
Because Sharon Donna McIvor’s status entitlement moved through her mother-line rather than her father-line she was only entitled to 6(1)c status, where this prevented her from passing on status registration to her son’s children. McIvor took this to court arguing it violated section 15 of the Charter. She won her case but Canada appealed the decision to the British Columbia Court of Appeal where the court ruled that some of the sex discrimination was justified. The justification was that the matter was an issue of matrilineal descent not sex discrimination. Then the court relied on the 1951 double-mother clause imposed on the descendants of Indian men as the comparator group to narrow down the remedy. This was a terrible moment for Indigenous women. McIvor wanted 6(1)a for all her descendants born before 1985 rather than what she, her son, and grandchildren gained: 6(1)c, 6(1)c1, and 6(2) respectively. The Supreme Court of Canada refused to hear her appeal and so McIvor quickly filed a petition with the United Nations. Through Bill C-3 the Indian Act was once again amended yet sex discrimination continued.

Stéphane Descheneaux was unable to pass status because he was only registered as a 6(2) Indian. This was the result of his matrilineal descent, meaning it was his grandmother rather than his grandfather who was Indian. This became known as the "cousins issue" in that Stéphane’s second cousin born through the patrilineal line was entitled to 6(1)a status. In Susan Yantha’s situation, as a girl child born out of wedlock pre-1985 she was only registered as a 6(2) Indian which meant she could not pass on status to her daughter Tammy, where as her hypothetical brother born out-of-wedlock was entitled to 6(1)a. This was known as the "siblings issue". In 2015 they won and the judge was clear there was the need to eliminate all the sex discrimination. Through Bill S-3 the Indian Act was amended again.

=== Dr. Lynn Gehl ===
As Canada was making these arguments that all the sex discrimination was being addressed through Bill S-3 Lynn Gehl's case on unknown and unstated paternity was heard in the Ontario Court of Appeal. Gehl was denied Indian status registration because through Indian and Northern Affairs' unknown and unstated paternity policy it was assumed her unknown grandfather was a non-Indian man. After 16 years of litigation, Gehl won her case on appeal in 2017 when the court argued Canada had to be reasonable and look at the circumstantial evidence of her own father's birth. As a result of the case, clauses addressing unknown and unstated paternity were included in the Bill S-3 remedy. While Gehl won her case, like McIvor, she was faced with a new form of discrimination. Although she was born before 1985 the court ruled she was entitled to 6(2) Indian status.

Like other members of the Indigenous Famous Six Gehl has a long history of advocacy regarding the need for Canada to eliminate the sex discrimination in the Indian Act. She has taken the time to write several community based articles, and relying on her understanding of cultural politics she birthed the slogan "6(1)a All the Way!" as her effort to keep the issue in the public eye and give the matter more currency in the political area.

In the fall of 2021, "Gehl v Canada: Challenging Sex Discrimination in the Indian Act" was published with University of Regina Press. This ″is the only full-length, first-person account of a leading case about discrimination against women in the Indian Act of Canada″ (Eberts in Gehl, 2021.)

=== Lillian Eva Dyck ===
While Canada claimed that it had removed all sex-based discrimination in the determination of Indian status registration in Bill S-3, the Standing Senate Committee on Aboriginal Peoples which was charged with examining the bill, discovered that this was not so. Under the leadership of Senator Lillian Dyck, the committee undertook several unique moves to make the government amend the bill to fulfill its stated objectives. The committee refused to study the bill until it was appropriately amended by the government; furthermore, the committee members, particularly Senator Lillian Dyck, convinced the senate as a whole not to pass the bill until it was amended to fulfill the goal of "6(1)a All the Way!"; that being to eliminate the 6(1)a and 6(1)c hierarchy and restore status to descendants all the way back to 1869.

The collective advocacy of Jeannette Corbiere-Lavell, Yvonne Bedard, Senator Sandra Lovelace-Nicholas, Sharon Donna McIvor, Lynn Gehl, Senator Lillian Dyck and allies Shelagh Day, Gwen Brodsky, Mary Eberts, Vivian Michele, Pamela Palmater, Senator Marilou MacPhedran, and Senator Kim Pate were critically important in pushing Canada to amend Bill S-3 to remove all sex-based discrimination in the Indian registry. The bill was enacted in two stages; in the first stage, status was restored to descendants with a 1951 cut off and in the second stage, status was restored all the way back to 1869. The second stage came into force by an order-in-council at a later date which allowed the government time to consult with stakeholders such as First Nation Chiefs.

== Senate honour ==
On Equality Day, April 17, 2018, Senator Marilou McPhedran invited the Indigenous Famous Six into the senate of Canada chamber to introduce and honour them for the work they took on. In her speech, she explained the purpose of the name, saying:

Some of us have asked why we named them the Famous Six. Well, colleagues, this is based on words of the visionary Famous Five feminists in the Persons Case that opened the Senate to women, honoured by the statues erected on Parliament Hill just metres away from our Senate entrance. The Indigenous Famous Six represent the movement for Indigenous women’s equality using the law, starting in the 1970s with Ms. Jeannette Corbiere-Lavell and Ms. Yvonne Bedard and Senator Sandra Lovelace Nicholas, and into the 1980s, 1990s and now, Dr. Sharon McIvor, Dr. Lynn Gehl and Senator Lillian Dyck.

== United Nations ruling on the McIvor Case ==
While Canada was consulting on the matter of the ongoing and never-ending sex discrimination in the Indian Act, on January 11, 2019, the United Nations International Covenant on Civil and Political Rights committee ruled on Sharon McIvor's 2010 petition. The UN committee concluded that Canada was under an obligation to provide Sharon McIvor and her son Jacob Grismer with an effective remedy. The UN required Canada to make full reparation to individuals whose rights had been violated simply because of their matrilineal descent. Further, Canada was obligated to ensure that section 6(1)a of the 1985 Indian Act be interpreted as to provide 6(1)a registration equally to all persons born before April 17, 1985, regardless of their patrilineal or matrilineal descent. The UN ruled there must not be preferential treatment.

On February 19, 2019, Senator Lillian Eva Dyck tabled a motion in the Senate chamber urging Canada to bring into force the remaining "6(1)a All the Way" provisions of Bill S-3 ending all the sex discrimination in the Indian Act once and for all. It was unanimously adopted.

== Order-in-Council ==
On August 16, 2019 Prime Minister Justin Trudeau issued an order-in-council proclaiming all outstanding provisions of Bill S-3 into force this ending 162 years of sex discrimination in the Indian Act.
