= Estonian Association of Gerontology and Geriatrics =

Organization based in Estonia

- Formation: 1997
- Type: Non-profit professional association
- Purpose: Advance geriatric care
- Location: Tartu, Estonia
- Region served: Estonia
- Chairman of the Board: Jelena Leibur
- Website: www.egga.ee/index.php

The Estonian Association of Gerontology and Geriatrics (EGGA) (Estonian: Eesti Gerontoloogia ja Geriaatria Assotsiatsioon) is an association of Estonian professionals who work with the elderly, established in 1997.

== Activities ==
As of 2005 the association had 154 members. These included doctors, nurses and paid or volunteer care givers, managers of institutions that care for the elderly and academics. It undertakes professional training, development of geriatric care guidelines and standards, research and preparation of educational and informational material. The Association contributed to a 2010 study undertaken by the OECD to examine improvements to public service delivery and performance through a single government approach.

The Association is a member of the International Association of Gerontology (IAG) and the European Union Geriatric Medicine Society (EUGMS). As of 2004 the Association was a member of CARMA - Care for the Aged at Risk of Marginalization - a European social policy research project. EGGA is associated with Abuel, which conducts research on abuse of the elderly for use in policy formulation by government agencies in Europe. It is also associated with the Academic Network of European Disability Experts.

== Citations and references ==
=== Cited sources ===
- "Research centres". Abuel. Archived from the original on 2013-08-13.
- "Board". Estonian Association of Gerontology and Geriatrics.
- "Data and research (Estonia)". Academic Network of European Disability Experts.
- Egger de Campo, Marianne (2004). "CARMA - Care for the Aged at Risk of Marginalization" (PDF). Archived from the original (PDF) on 2016-03-05.
- Kolk, Helgi (2006). "Geriatric Medicine in Estonia in 2006". European Union of Medical Specialists. Archived from the original on 2016-03-04.
- OECD (2011-08-23). OECD Public Governance Reviews Estonia: Towards a Single Government Approach. OECD Publishing. ISBN 978-92-64-10484-6.
