= Peri, Estonia =

Village in Estonia

Peri
- Village
- Location in Estonia
- Coordinates: 58°01′02″N 27°05′15″E
- Country: Estonia
- County: Põlva
- Municipality: Põlva
- First mentioned: 1554

Population (01.01.2010)
  - Total: 364

Peri (German: Perrist) is a village in Põlva Parish, Põlva County in southeastern Estonia, about 4 km (2 mi) southeast of the town of Põlva. Its population was 364 as of 1 January 2010.

== History ==
Peri was first mentioned in 1554 (Memskul, Perrist). The Peri manor is known to have existed in 1544, when it belonged to the von Tödwen family. In the 18th century, it was acquired by the von Glasenapps, and in 1863 by the Lilienfelds who were its last owners before the dispossession in 1919. The wooden Baroque main building has not survived.

After the Soviet occupation, the lands of the manor and nearby farms' lands were nationalized and a Vilde-named kolkhoz was established; thus the village centre now contains several Soviet-style residential and industrial buildings. A local society centre with a library operates in Peri.

== Geography ==
The 18 km-long (11 miles) Peri stream passes the village.

== Notable people ==
- Geneticist Riin Tamm (born 1981) spent her childhood living in Peri before going to a gymnasium in Tartu.
