= Andres Metspalu =

Estonian geneticist

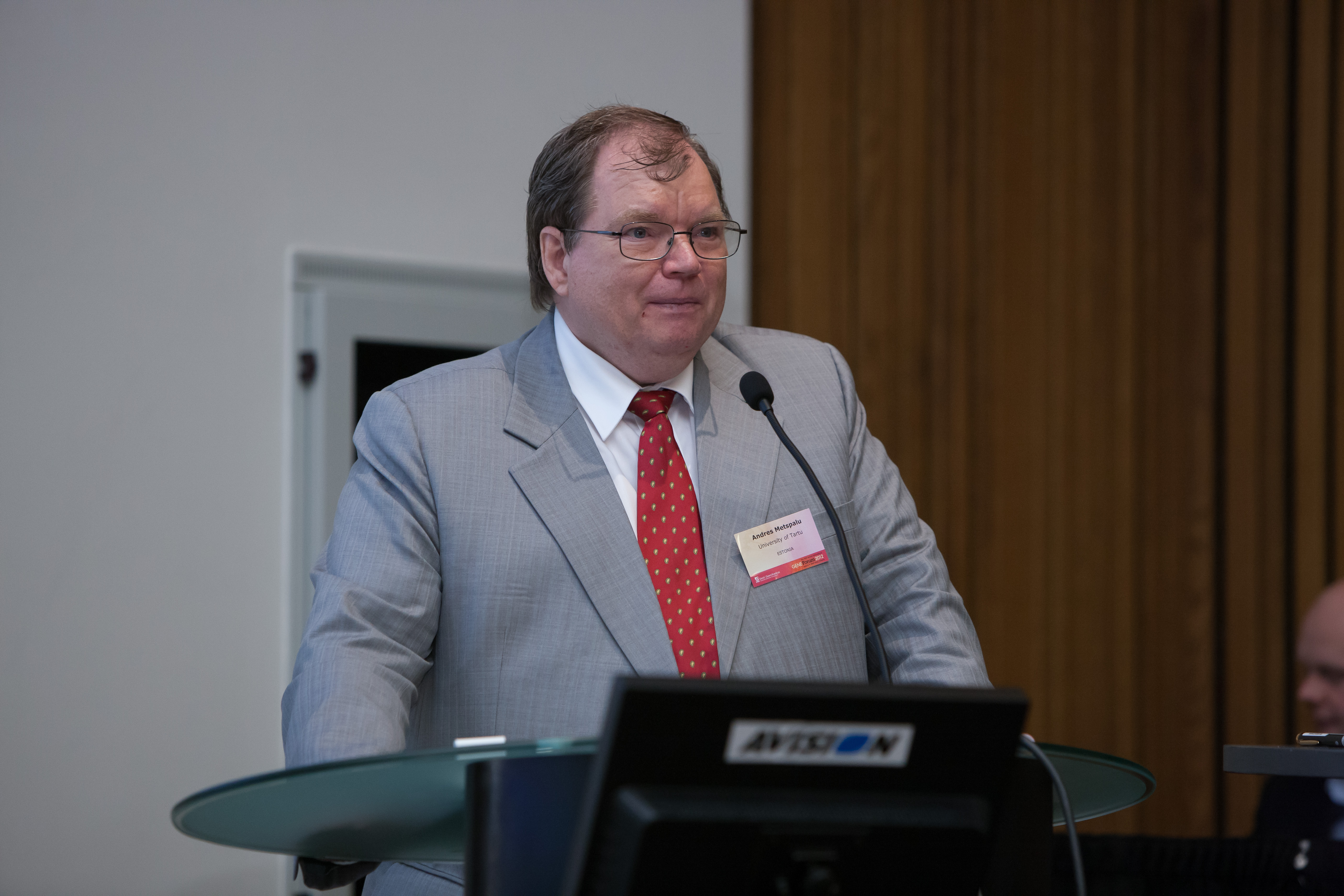
- Born: March 11, 1951 (age 74); Lääne-Viru County, Estonia
- Occupation: Geneticist
- Known for: Director of the Estonian Genome Center at the University of Tartu

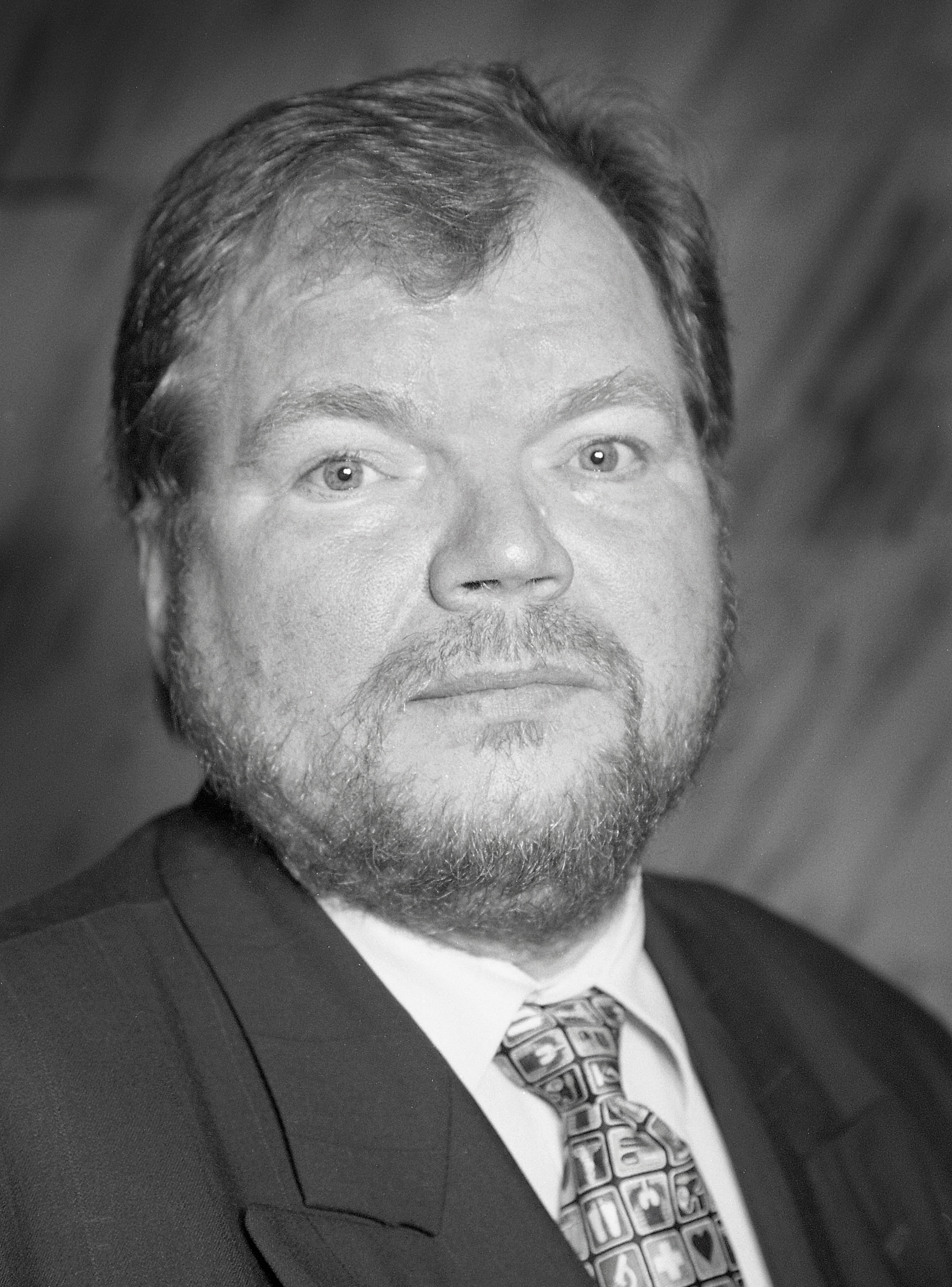
Andres Metspalu in 1999

Andres Metspalu (born 11 March 1951) is an Estonian geneticist and member of the Estonian Academy of Sciences.

== Biography ==
Metspalu was born on 11 March 1951 in Lääne-Viru County. In 1969 he graduated from the Rakke High School. In 1976 he graduated from the University of Tartu, Faculty of Medicine, as a physician. In 1979 he obtained a Ph.D. in Molecular Biology from the Institute of Molecular Genetics at the National Academy of Sciences of Ukraine in Kiev. His thesis was on the structure and function of the Eukaryotic ribosome.

From 1976 to 1980, Metspalu was a junior scientist at Laboratory of Molecular Biology, University of Tartu. From 1981 to 1982, he was an IREX fellow at Columbia University. He returned to the Laboratory of Molecular Biology as a Senior Scientist, then from 1985 to 1992 was head of the Laboratory of Gene Expression at Tartu University. From 1986 to 1992, he was Research Director of the Estonian Biocentre. During that period he also visited the Max Planck Institute for Molecular Genetics, the University of Tampere, and the University of Hamburg.

In 1992, Metspalu was appointed to the Chair of Biotechnology at the University of Tartu, and head of the Gene Technology Laboratory, Estonian Biocentre. In 1993 he spent three months at the University of Hamburg's H. Pette Institute for Experimental Immunolog, and then from 1993 to 1994 was a visiting professor at Baylor College of Medicine's Dept. of Molecular and Human Genetics with C. Thomas Caskey. From 1996 to 2007, he was again head of the Molecular Diagnostics Centre at Tartu University Clinics. In 1999, he was founder and Chairman of Asper Biotech Ltd. in Tartu. During that period he visited the International Agency for Research on Cancer (1999-2000) and was founder and Chief Scientific Officer at EGeen International Inc. (Foster City, California; 2002-2004). Since 2007 he has been Director of the Estonian Genome Center at the University of Tartu.

== Research ==
Metspalu became interested in DNA, genes, and ribosomes in high school, but made his final decision to follow this subject in his fourth semester of molecular biology, when he began practical research in biochemistry under Artur Lind. In 1981 Metspalu had the opportunity to work as a research fellow in Columbia and Yale Universities in the United States. On his returning from America, he contributed knowledge to the molecular biology lab at the University of Tartu, which obtained a new generation of devices and began to undertake modern genetic science. Metspalu's major fields of research are genomics and genetic engineering, human genome research methods for large variation in gene banks; genetics and complex diseases, the relationship of genes, environmental factors, lifestyle, and state of health between the molecular and genetic analysis in developing the technology of DNA chip technology.

== Professional service ==
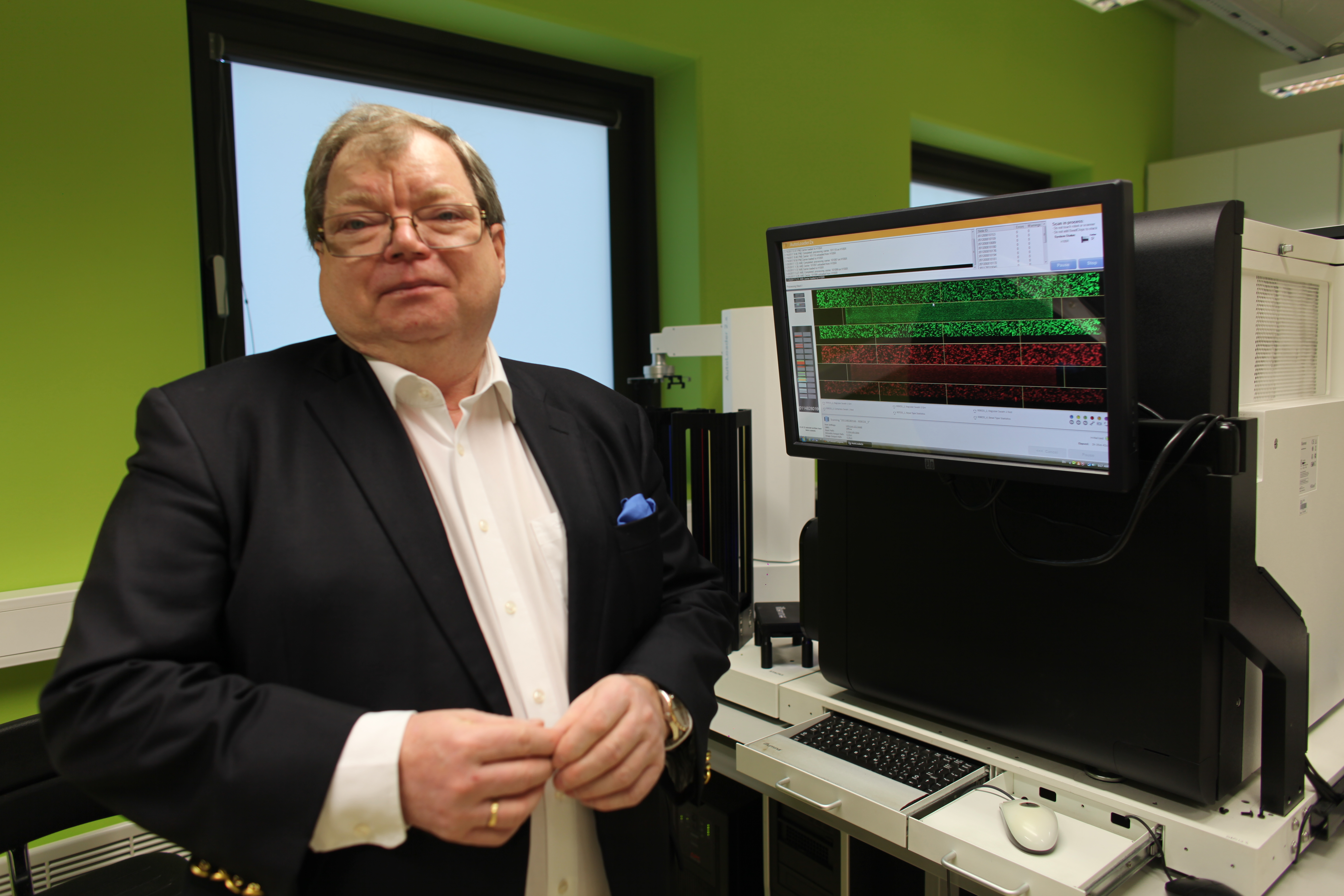
Andres Metspalu at the Genomics Institute in 20217

Metspalu is active in various research organizations in Estonia and abroad. He is president of the Estonian Human Genetics Society and a member of the Steering Committee of the Genomics Center of Excellence, as well as the Human Genetics Society Steering Committee of the Human Genome Organization, American Society of Human Genetics, and ScanBalt Academy.

== Awards ==
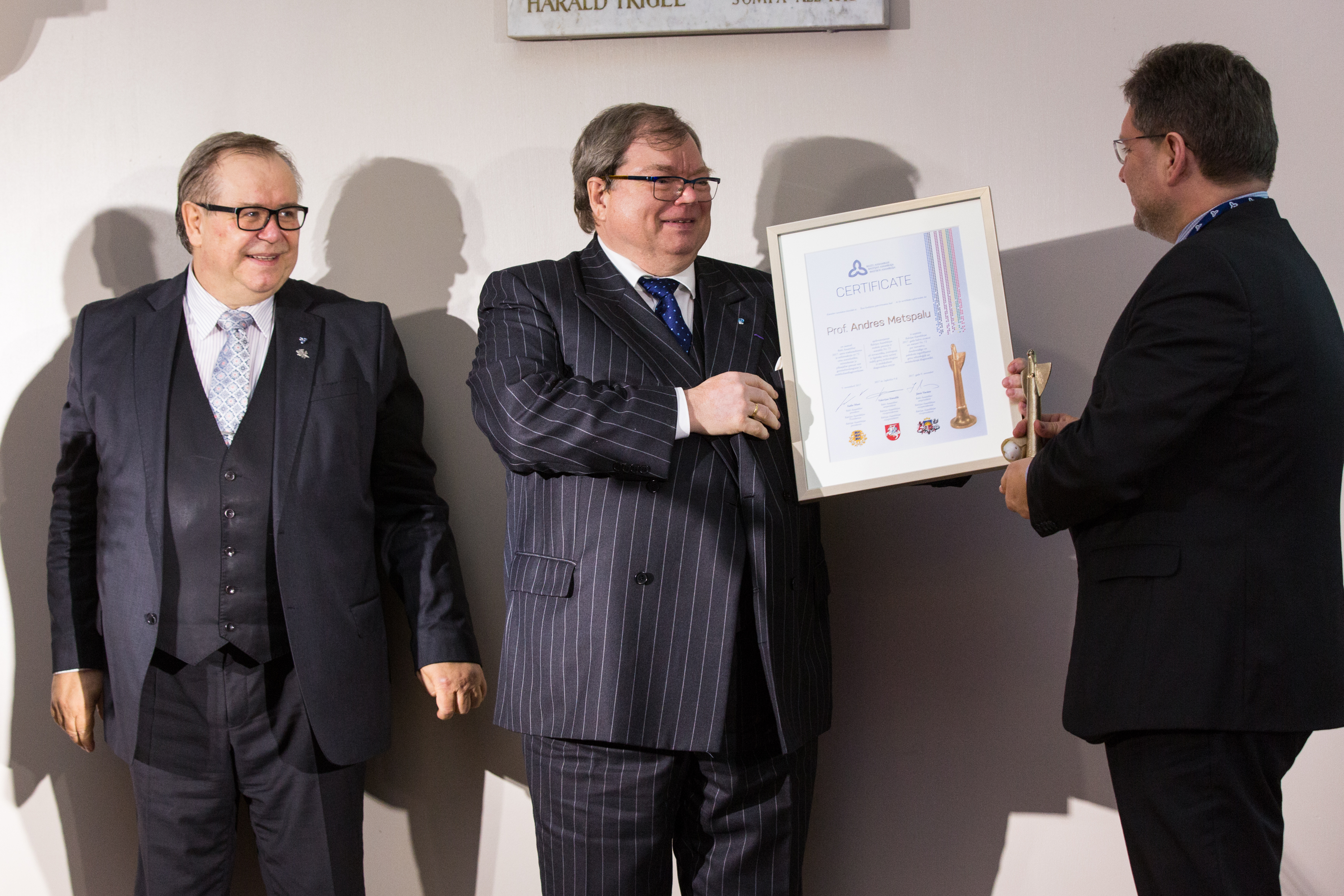
Andres Metspalu in 2017

On two occasions, Metspalu won the Science Prize (1980, 2003). In 2001 he was awarded the Estonian Red Cross Order of Merit Class III. In 2002 he won the French Award "Prix de la Garantie Medicale et Chirurgicale" and in 2003 was made Chevalier of the "Ordre des Palmes Académiques". In 2010 he was made an honorary member of Vilnius University, with an honorary doctorate. In 2017, he was awarded the Baltic Assembly Prize for Science in recognition of "his innovative, diverse and lasting contribution to gene technology and molecular diagnostic".

== Sources ==
- "Andres Metspalu". ETIS - Estonian Research Portal.
- "Andres Metspalu". ETA: Estonian Academy of Sciences.
