= Longest linear sequence =

In synthetic chemistry, the longest linear sequence, commonly abbreviated as LLS, is the largest number of reactions required to go from the starting materials to the products in a multistep sequence.

This concept is very important when trying to optimize a synthetic plan. Since every reaction step can decrease the yield of the product, reducing the value of the LLS is a good way to increase the quantity of chemicals formed at the end: this can be done by devising quicker methods to couple the fragments or by introducing convergence. However, improving sequences which are not the longest linear one will generally not produce an overall enhancement to the yield of the reaction since the benefits incur in intermediates that were already present in excess, assuming that the yields for each of the steps are roughly equal.
