= Shelley Niro =

First Nations artist (born 1954)

- Born: 1954 (age 71–72); Niagara Falls, New York
- Education: Ontario College of Art (BFA); University of Western Ontario (MFA)
- Known for: Performance artist, installation artist, filmmaker
- Awards: Scotiabank Photography Award, 2017
- Website: shelleyniro.ca

Shelley Niro RCA (born 1954) is a Mohawks of the Bay of Quinte filmmaker and visual artist from New York and Ontario. She is known for her photographs using herself and female family members cast in contemporary positions to challenge the stereotypes and clichés of Native American women.

A multidisciplinary contemporary artist skilled in photography, painting, sculpting, beadwork, multimedia, and independent film, Niro is a member of the Turtle clan of the Kanien'kehá:ka (Mohawk people) from Six Nations of the Grand River.

== Early life and education ==
Shelley Niro was born in Niagara Falls, New York and grew up on the Six Nations of the Grand River Reserve, near Brantford, Ontario, Canada.

Niro's home life made it easy for creativity to flourish while entertaining her siblings through songs, storytelling, and picture drawing. Niro's family had a big impact on her work, and would later make appearances in various compositions. Niro's artistic ambitions began with her earning a diploma in performing arts from Cambrian College in Sudbury, Ontario, in 1972. In 1990, she received an honors fine arts degree in painting and sculpture from Ontario College of Art. Niro went on to earn a master of fine arts from the University of Western Ontario in 1997. In 2000, Niro attended the Banff Centre for the Arts to study film.

== Art career ==
Niro explored the oral history of the Haudenosaunee people in general and the diaspora of Mohawk people in particular. She is known for her photography, which often combines portraits of living Native women with customary Mohawk imagery. She uses herself, friends, and family members as models. Her 1992 photographic series, This Land Is Mime Land and 500 Year Itch employ humorous pop culture references, such as Elvis Presley and Marilyn Monroe. Niro often works in diptychs and triptychs, using photographic processes such as photo montage, hand tints, and sepia tones.

Shelly Niro is often compared to the artist Cindy Sherman because they both cast themselves in different roles in an attempt to break down various stereotypes. Niro, however, never fully disguises herself. "She wants the viewer to recognize her within her manifestations."

As her skills advanced, Niro would feature family members in her art pieces. Her piece Time Travels Through Us shows her mother and two of her sisters as a way to represent the social, cultural, and personal values passed from generation to generation. The colors purple and silver reference Haudenosaunee aesthetics and culture. A turtle represents Niro's spirit animal, as well as being a reference to the Turtle Clan of which she is a member.

Most of Niro's work is conceptual, touching on themes of gender imbalance, cultural appropriation, and the importance of cultural influences. She uses the immersion of different mediums to engage her audience with her perspective. In spite of the serious themes such as cultural loss and oppression, some of Niro's pieces have used humor and satire as a form of resistance to convey social misconceptions about her culture while poking fun at outdated stereotypes and ideas.

In 2023, the Art Gallery of Hamilton, Smithsonian Institution's National Museum of the American Indian, New York City, and National Gallery of Canada, Ottawa venue presented a retrospective exhibition of Niro's work, Shelley Niro:500 Year Itch. The retrospective included the premiere of her newest film, Café Daughter.

== Selected exhibitions ==
Group exhibitions include:

- 1999: Across Borders: Beadwork in Iroquois Life, McCord Museum, Montreal, Quebec
- 2019: Hearts of Our People: Native Women Artists, Minneapolis Institute of Art, Minneapolis, MN
- Radical Stitch, MacKenzie Art Gallery (2022).

Solo exhibitions:

- Shelley Niro: 500 Year Itch was organized and circulated by the Art Gallery of Hamilton with the Smithsonian's National Museum of the American Indian (NMAI), with curatorial support from the National Gallery of Canada (NGC).

== Film and video ==
- It Starts with a Whisper (1993), producer, director
- Overweight with Crooked Teeth (1997), producer, director
- Honey Moccasin (1998), director; stars Tantoo Cardinal
- The Shirt (2003), director; stars Hulleah Tsinhnahjinnie
- The Flying Head (2008), director
- Kissed by Lightning (2009), producer, director
- The Incredible 25th Year of Mitzi Bearclaw (2019)
- Café Daughter (2023)

== Awards and recognition ==
The National Museum of American History named Niro a fellow in 1997. She won the Walking in Beauty Award for her 1992 production It Starts With a Whisper. The film Honey Moccasin won Best Experimental Work at the Dreamspeakers Festival in Edmonton, Alberta and Best Feature, Best Actress, Best Actor, and Best Director at the Red Earth Festival in Oklahoma City, Oklahoma. She was made a member of the Royal Canadian Academy of Arts. Her short film The Shirt was presented at the 2003 Venice Biennale and the 2004 Sundance Film Festival in Park City, UT. Niro was awarded a Governor General's Award in Visual and Media Arts in 2017.

Niro's art has been featured in several exhibitions and museums across Canada and the United States, including the National Museum of the American Indian (NMAI). Her artistic achievements have also earned Niro fellowships and residencies at major educational and cultural institutions, and the honor of being "Guest Selector" for the NMAI's "Native American Film + Video Festival".

Niro participated in prominent exhibitions at the Venice Biennale. In 2003, Niro was the exhibition artist for the Indigenous Arts Action Alliance (IA3) showcasing her photography work, as well as her short film The Shirt which was later screened at the 2004 Sundance Film Festival.

Niro received two awards for the film Honey Moccasin which she directed in 1998. This film won "Best Experimental Work" at the Dreamspeakers Festival in Edmonton, and "Best Feature" at the Red Earth Film Festival in Oklahoma.

In 2009, Niro received the "Milagro Award for Best Indigenous Film" for Kissed by Lightning at the Santa Fe Film Festival.

She won the Scotiabank Photography Award in 2017. In 2020, she was awarded the Paul de Hueck and Norman Walford Career Achievement Award for Art Photography for outstanding achievement in the field of photography.

In 2020, Niro received the Paul de Hueck and Norman Walford Career Achievement Award.

== Quotations ==
"Some people think that to be Indian, you have to do certain things, but I'm saying that you're Indian no matter what you do, but you have to decide what you want to do and you have to ask questions, like, am I doing something because it's expected of me to do, or am I doing it because I really believe this and it's really a part of me. So I'm always questioning that, saying, "Am I being truthful to myself? How much a part of what I do is part of my psychology?" —Shelley Niro

== Personal life ==
Niro currently resides in Brantford, Ontario, with her husband.
