= Eline Slagboom =

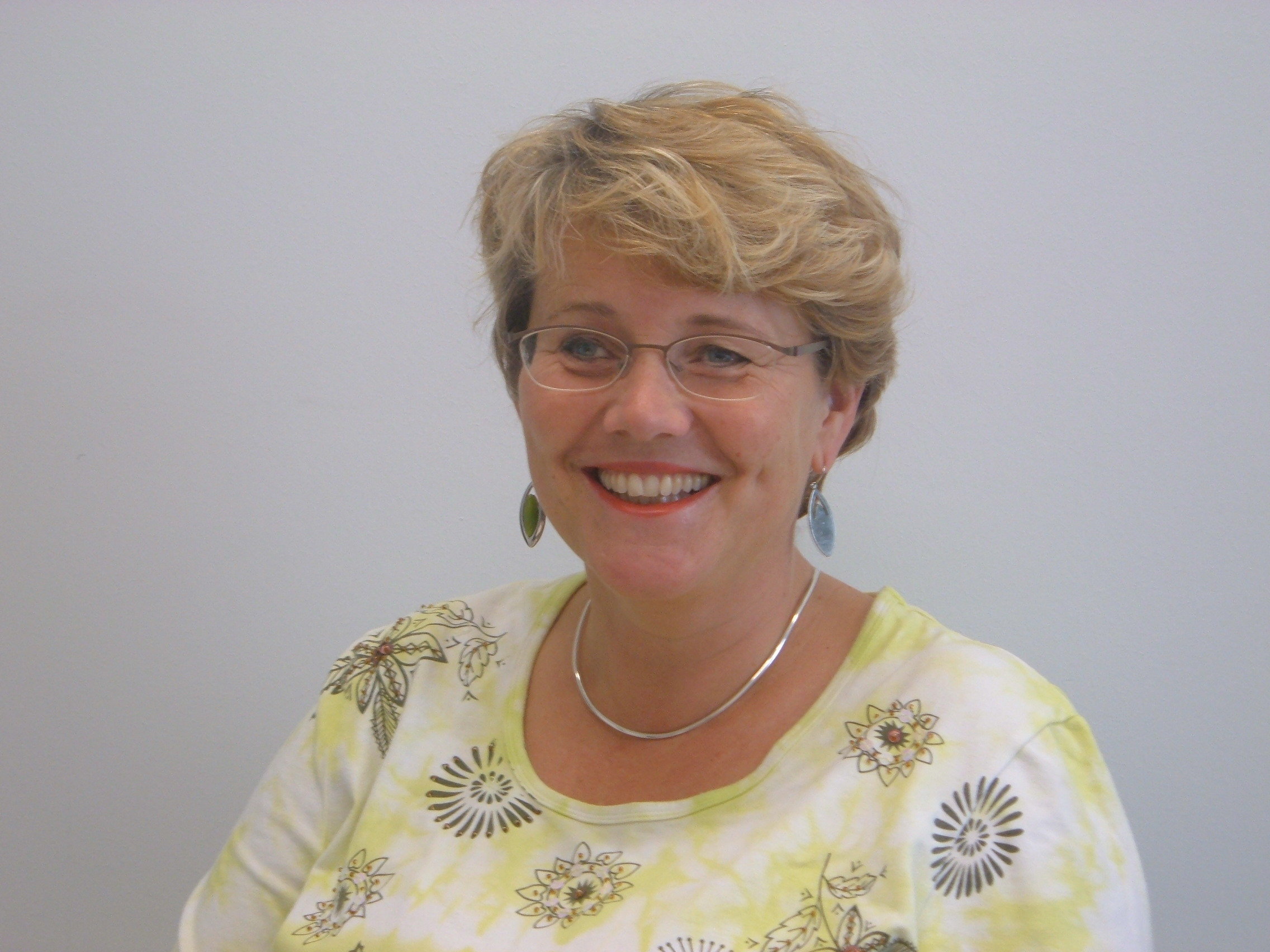
- Eline Slagboom (2006)
- Born: Pieternella Eline Slagboom; January 14, 1960 (age 66); Dordrecht
- Education: Leiden University
- Scientific career
- Fields: Molecular Epidemiology, human genetics, ageing, longevity, complex diseases, epigenetics
- Workplaces: Leiden University Medical Center
- Website: www.molepi.nl

Eline Slagboom (born 18 January 1960) is a Dutch biologist specializing in the human familial longevity and ageing. She is a professor of molecular epidemiology at the Leiden University Medical Center (LUMC), head of the section of Molecular Epidemiology within the department of Biomedical Data Sciences and chair of the LUMC Medical Research Profile on Ageing and of the DUSRA – Dutch Society for Research on Ageing.

== Education ==
Slagboom was born in 1960 in Dordrecht, the Netherlands. She attended Christelijk Lyceum in Delft, graduating in 1978, before continuing to Leiden University for her Bachelors (1979) and Masters (1985) degrees in biology. She finished her Doctor of Philosophy (Ph.D.) from the same institution, focusing on Genomic Instability and Aging (1993), with a doctoral thesis entitled Genomic instability and aging.

== Career ==
After receiving her Ph.D., Slagboom joined the Department of Vascular and Connective Tissues Research at the Gaubius Laboratory (TNO-PG, the Netherlands). As a post doc she initiated a unit for genetic epidemiological studies aimed at the identification of genetic determinants of multifactorial diseases. Slagboom started between 1995 and 1997 a genetic research line on osteoarthritis (OA) including linkage studies in families with early onset OA, genetic association studies in population cohorts and linkage studies in populations of affected sibling-pairs. From 1998 on, Slagboom, in collaboration with research groups at different universities, obtained various grants that allowed initiation of a genotyping facility for genome scanning at the Netherlands Organisation for Applied Scientific Research (TNO). In 2000, Slagboom was appointed as professor of molecular epidemiology at the Leiden University Medical Center (LUMC). She established a new section of Molecular Epidemiology and Genotyping Center at the department of Medical Statistics and Bioinformatics. Slagboom has initiated a masterclass for Statistical Analysis of Genetic Data and Bioinformatics in Genomic Research and is involved in various teaching activities.

Focus of the research in the past 10 years is on genomic, epigenetic and biomarker studies of healthy/unhealthy ageing and familial longevity in humans. These studies include genomics, metabolomics, and proteomics analysis of age-related disease. A diversity of human cohorts with unique study designs is being analysed for this purpose. Slagboom is one of two founders of the Research on Ageing at the Leiden University Medical Center, supported among other foundations by the Netherlands Genomic Initiative. She initiated and heads the Leiden Longevity Study (LLS) together with R.G.J. Westendorp and a research cohort of osteoarthritis patients. The mission of her research group is the identification of genomic factors, biomarkers, and functional mechanisms marking and contributing to complex diseases in humans with a focus on ageing, longevity, and age-related disease. Slagboom has a leading role in large consortia within ageing research such as the Netherlands Consortium on Healthy Ageing, in which she established collaborative research with industry, and European Union large scale collaborative research projects (Treat~OA, GEHA, and LIFESPAN).

Currently she heads a group of 15–20 scientists and academic staff has now started to obtain grants for new research lines (functional genomic studies in osteoarthritis and studies into interaction between genetic and epigenetic variation). She is PI of a new large scale collaborative FP7 project (IDEAL: Integrated research on DEvelopmental determinants of Ageing and Longevity) together with Bas Zwaan (Wageningen University and Research Centre; 2011–2016).
