= Life Sciences (journal) =

Peer-reviewed scientific journal

- Discipline: Pharmacology
- Language: English
- Edited by: Loren E. Wold

Publication details
- History: 1962-present
- Publisher: Elsevier
- Frequency: Weekly
- Impact factor: 6.780 (2021)

Standard abbreviations
- ISO 4: Life Sci.

Indexing
- CODEN: LIFSAK
- ISSN: 0024-3205 (print); 1879-0631 (web)
- LCCN: 85644789
- OCLC no.: 01715961

Links
- Journal homepage; Online access

Life Sciences is a weekly peer-reviewed scientific journal covering research on the cellular, molecular, and physiological mechanisms of pharmacotherapy. It was started in 1962 by Pergamon Press.

According to the Journal Citation Reports, Life Sciences has a 2021 impact factor of 6.780.

The current editor-in-chief is Loren E. Wold.
