= Robert A. Holton =

American academic chemist (1944–2025)

Robert Holton
- Born: January 26, 1944; Fayetteville, North Carolina, U.S.
- Died: May 21, 2025 (aged 81); Tallahassee, Florida, U.S.
- Education: Florida State University, PhD
- Alma mater: Florida State University; University of North Carolina
- Occupations: chemist and professor
- Known for: Holton Taxol total synthesis Florida Inventors Hall of Fame
- Spouse: married twice
- Children: 3

Robert Anthony Holton (January 26, 1944 – May 21, 2025) was an American chemist and academic renowned for his pioneering work in the chemical synthesis of the anti-cancer drug Taxol (paclitaxel). Holton’s research enabled large-scale production of Taxol, transforming cancer treatment and saving countless lives. He was a professor of chemistry at Florida State University (FSU) and is widely recognized for achieving the first total synthesis of Taxol, a landmark accomplishment in synthetic organic chemistry.

== Early life and education ==
The son of Aaron T. and Marion (née Downing) Holton, Robert Holton was born in Fayetteville, North Carolina on January 26, 1944, and raised in Charlotte. He was the son of Marion Downing Holton and Aaron T. Holton. He earned his undergraduate degree in chemistry from the University of North Carolina at Chapel Hill, where he met his first wife, Juanita Bird. After moving to Tallahassee, he earned his doctorate from Florida State University and welcomed his first son, Robert.

Following postdoctoral work at Stanford University, during which time his second son, David, was born, Holton held faculty positions at Purdue University and Virginia Tech. In 1986, he returned to FSU with his second wife, Marie E. Krafft, where they both held faculty appointments in the Department of Chemistry and Biochemistry. During this time they had a son together, Paul. Holton spent the remainder of his career at FSU.

== Scientific contributions ==
In the 1960s, researchers at the National Cancer Institute isolated paclitaxel from the bark of the Pacific yew tree, discovering its potent anti-cancer properties through microtubule stabilization. However, natural extraction was limited and unsustainable. In 1989, Holton and his research team at FSU developed a groundbreaking semi-synthetic process using 10-deacetylbaccatin III—a more renewable precursor—enabling large-scale production of Taxol. Bristol Myers Squibb commercialized the drug in the early 1990s.

When Taxol received FDA approval in 1993, the National Cancer Institute called it “the most important cancer drug developed in the previous 15 years.” More than a million patients have since been treated with it. In 1994, Holton’s team achieved the first total synthesis of Taxol, marking a significant milestone in organic chemistry and the culmination of an international scientific race.

Beyond Taxol, Holton’s group accomplished the total synthesis of several other complex natural products, including prostaglandin F₂α, narwedine, aphidicolin, taxusin, and hemibrevetoxin B. He co-founded Taxolog, Inc. with colleague Lewis Metts to develop new taxane-based therapies for cancer and other diseases. Holton also served as the company’s chief scientific officer and was president and founder of MDS Research Foundation and Syncure, Inc.

== Recognition and awards ==
Holton received numerous honors for his scientific contributions. In 1999, Florida State University named him Distinguished Research Professor, and in 2001, he received the Holton Medal for Distinguished Research Service. In 2007, he was awarded the Medalist Award by the Florida Academy of Sciences. Holton was inducted into the Florida Inventors Hall of Fame in 2015 and named a Fellow of the National Academy of Inventors in 2018, recognizing the profound impact of his research.

== Personal life and legacy ==
Holton was married to Juanita Bird and had two sons, divorcing in the early 1980s. He later married Marie Krafft, a chemistry professor, and had another son. She died in 2014. He and his wife spent years restoring a rural property outside Tallahassee, Florida, where he resided until his death.

Holton died from emphysema at his home in Tallahassee, Florida, on May 21, 2025, at the age of 81.

A remembrance from Florida State University stated that Holton was known for his precision and high standards, qualities that shaped his work in the lab and his daily life.
