= Biochemical Pharmacology (journal) =

- Discipline: Pharmacology
- Language: English
- Edited by: J. Piette

Publication details
- History: 1958-present
- Publisher: Elsevier
- Frequency: Monthly
- Impact factor: 5.858 (2019)

Standard abbreviations
- ISO 4: Biochem. Pharmacol.

Indexing
- CODEN: BCPCA6
- ISSN: 0006-2952 (print); 1873-2968 (web)
- LCCN: 58004837
- OCLC no.: 01536391

Links
- Journal homepage; Online access

Biochemical Pharmacology is a peer-reviewed medical journal published by Elsevier. It covers research on the pharmacodynamics and pharmacokinetics of drugs and non-therapeutic xenobiotics. The editor-in-chief is Jacques Piette, University of Liege.

== Abstracting and indexing ==
The journal is abstracted and indexed in:

- BIOSIS
- Chemical Abstracts
- Current Contents
- EMBASE
- Elsevier BIOBASE
- MEDLINE
- PASCAL
- Scopus

According to the Journal Citation Reports, the journal received a 2019 impact factor of 5.858.
