= Gordon 86 =

Indian reserve in Saskatchewan, Canada

Coordinates: 51°15′43″N 104°15′23″W

- Indian reserve
- Gordon Indian Reserve No. 86
- Location in Saskatchewan
- First Nation: George Gordon
- Country: Canada
- Province: Saskatchewan

Area
  - Total: 14,438.3 ha (35,678 acres)

Population (2016)
  - Total: 837
  - Density: 5.80/km^{2} (15.0/sq mi)
- Community Well-Being Index: 52

Gordon 86 is a Cree Indian reserve in Saskatchewan, Canada, located about 61 kilometres (38 mi) north-west of Fort Qu'Appelle. Also known as the George Gordon Reserve, it is one of three territories of the George Gordon First Nation, as arranged by the signing of Treaty 4. The reserve has an area of 14,438.3 hectares (35,677.8 acres). In the 2016 Canadian Census, it recorded a population of 837 living in 218 of its 238 total private dwellings. In the same year, its Community Well-Being index was calculated at 52 of 100, compared to 58.4 for the average First Nations community and 77.5 for the average non-Indigenous community. It is almost completely surrounded by the rural municipality of Touchwood No. 248.

== See also ==
- List of Indian reserves in Saskatchewan
