= List of Indian reserves in Canada =

Canada has numerous Indian reserves, also known as First Nations reserves, for First Nations people, which were mostly established in 1876 by the Indian Act and have been variously expanded and reduced by royal commissions since. They are sometimes incorrectly called by the American term "reservations".

== Alberta ==
List of Indian reserves and settlements in Alberta
Name as used by Indigenous and Northern Affairs Canada	First Nation(s)	Ethnic/national group	Tribal council	Treaty	Area		Population			Notes
Name as used by Indigenous and Northern Affairs Canada	First Nation(s)	Ethnic/national group	Tribal council	Treaty	ha	acre	2016	2011	% difference	Notes
Ɂejëre Kʼelnı Kuę́ 196I	Smith's Landing	Dene		8	213.0	526.3				INAC lists the reserve in Alberta and the band headquartered in Fort Smith, Northwest Territories
Alexander 134	Alexander	Beaver Hills Cree	Yellowhead Tribal Development Foundation	6	7,280.5	17,990.5	1,099	1,027	7.0%	
Alexander 134A	Alexander	Beaver Hills Cree	Yellowhead Tribal Development Foundation	6	2,303.3	5,691.6				
Alexander 134B	Alexander	Beaver Hills Cree	Yellowhead Tribal Development Foundation	6	3.4	8.4				
Alexis 133	Alexis Nakota Sioux	Nakoda	Yellowhead Tribal Development Foundation	6	6,175.2	15,259.3	755	817	-7.6%	
Alexis Cardinal River 234	Alexis Nakota Sioux	Nakoda	Yellowhead Tribal Development Foundation	6	4,661.0	11,517.6				
Alexis Elk River 233	Alexis Nakota Sioux	Nakoda	Yellowhead Tribal Development Foundation	6	98.0	242.2				
Alexis Whitecourt 232	Alexis Nakota Sioux	Nakoda	Yellowhead Tribal Development Foundation	6	3,544.9	8,759.6				
Allison Bay 219	Mikisew Cree	Woodland Cree		8	1,861.0	4,598.6	127	84	51.2%	
Amber River 211	Dene Tha'	Slavey	North Peace Tribal Council	8	2,332.3	5,763.2				
Assineau River 150F	Swan River	Woods Cree	Lesser Slave Lake Indian Regional Council	8	71.6	176.9				
Beaver Lake 131	Beaver Lake Cree	Cree	Tribal Chiefs Ventures Incorporated	6	6,145.3	15,185.4	414	423	-2.1%	
Beaver Ranch 163	Tallcree First Nation	Woodland Cree	North Peace Tribal Council	8	841.7	2,079.9	10	16	-37.5%	
Beaver Ranch 163A	Tallcree First Nation	Woodland Cree	North Peace Tribal Council	8	240.0	593.1				
Beaver Ranch 163B	Tallcree First Nation	Woodland Cree	North Peace Tribal Council	8	226.0	558.5				
Big Horn 144A	Bearspaw; Chiniki; Stoney; Wesley	Nakoda	Stoney Nakoda - Tsuut'ina Tribal Council	7	2,127.4	5,256.9	237	134	76.9%	
Bistcho Lake 213	Dene Tha'	Slavey	North Peace Tribal Council	8	354.1	875.0				
Blood 148	Blood	Blackfoot Confederacy	Blackfoot Confederacy	7	134,292.9	331,845.0	4,570	4,679	-2.3%	
Blood 148A	Blood	Blackfoot Confederacy	Blackfoot Confederacy	7	1,971.7	4,872.2				
Blue Quills First Nation Indian Reserve	Beaver Lake Cree; Cold Lake; Frog Lake; Heart Lake; Kehewin Cree; Saddle Lake	Cree; Chipewyan; Cree; Cree; Cree; Beaver Hills Cree	Tribal Chiefs Ventures Incorporated	6	96.2	237.7				
Boyer 164	Beaver	Dane-zaa	North Peace Tribal Council	8	4,249.3	10,500.2	218	213	2.3%	
Buck Lake 133C	Paul	Cree / Nakoda		6	1,035.2	2,558.0				
Bushe River 207	Dene Tha'	Slavey	North Peace Tribal Council	8	111,675.0	275,954.9	503	492	2.2%	
Charles Lake 225	Mikisew Cree	Woodland Cree		8	64.5	159.4				
Child Lake 164A	Beaver	Dane-zaa	North Peace Tribal Council	8	1,035.2	2,558.0	216	188	14.9%	
Chipewyan 201	Athabasca Chipewyan	Chipewyan	Athabasca Tribal Council	8	20,072.4	49,600.0				
Chipewyan 201A	Athabasca Chipewyan	Chipewyan	Athabasca Tribal Council	8	9,516.2	23,515.0	0	5	-100.0%	
Chipewyan 201B	Athabasca Chipewyan	Chipewyan	Athabasca Tribal Council	8	19.4	47.9				
Chipewyan 201C	Athabasca Chipewyan	Chipewyan	Athabasca Tribal Council	8	18.2	45.0				
Chipewyan 201D	Athabasca Chipewyan	Chipewyan	Athabasca Tribal Council	8	4.3	10.6				
Chipewyan 201E	Athabasca Chipewyan	Chipewyan	Athabasca Tribal Council	8	4,165.5	10,293.2				
Chipewyan 201F	Athabasca Chipewyan	Chipewyan	Athabasca Tribal Council	8	66.4	164.1				
Chipewyan 201G	Athabasca Chipewyan	Chipewyan	Athabasca Tribal Council	8	905.3	2,237.0				
Clear Hills 152C	Horse Lake	Cree / Dane-zaa	Western Cree Tribal Council	8	1,547.1	3,823.0				
Clearwater 175	Fort McMurray #468	Cree / Chipewyan	Athabasca Tribal Council	8	915.4	2,262.0				
Cold Lake 149	Cold Lake	Chipewyan	Tribal Chiefs Ventures Incorporated	6	14,528.1	35,899.7	671	594	13.0%	
Cold Lake 149A	Cold Lake	Chipewyan	Tribal Chiefs Ventures Incorporated	6	71.6	176.9	40	45	-11.1%	
Cold Lake 149B	Cold Lake	Chipewyan	Tribal Chiefs Ventures Incorporated	6	4,134.0	10,215.3	163	149	9.4%	
Cold Lake 149C	Cold Lake	Chipewyan	Tribal Chiefs Ventures Incorporated	6	2,023.5	5,000.2				
Collin Lake 223	Mikisew Cree	Woodland Cree		8	36.4	89.9				
Cornwall Lake 224	Mikisew Cree	Woodland Cree		8	69.3	171.2				
Cowper Lake 194A	Chipewyan Prairie	Chipewyan	Athabasca Tribal Council	8	143.0	353.4				
Devil's Gate 220	Mikisew Cree	Woodland Cree		8	819.1	2,024.0				
Dog Head 218	Mikisew Cree	Woodland Cree		8	34.8	86.0	99	111	-10.8%	
Drift Pile River 150	Driftpile Cree	Cree	Lesser Slave Lake Indian Regional Council	8	6,354.8	15,703.1	828	800	3.5%	
Duncans 151A	Duncan's	Woods Cree	Western Cree Tribal Council	8	2,036.8	5,033.0	150	164	-8.5%	
Eden Valley 216	Bearspaw; Chiniki; Stoney; Wesley	Nakoda	Stoney Nakoda - Tsuut'ina Tribal Council	7	1,690.8	4,178.1	596	587	1.5%	
Enoch Cree Nation 135	Enoch Cree	Beaver Hills Cree		6	5,306.2	13,111.9	1,690	987	71.2%	Was Stony Plain 135
Enoch Cree Nation No. 135A	Enoch Cree	Beaver Hills Cree		6	2.0	4.9				
Ermineskin 138	Ermineskin Tribe	Cree	Maskwacis Cree Tribal Council	6	10,295.8	25,441.5	2,457	1,874	31.1%	
Fitzgerald No. 196	Salt River First Nation #195	Dene	Akaitcho Territory Government	8	3,715.0	9,180.0				Headquartered in the NWT
Fort McKay 174	Fort McKay	Cree / Dene	Athabasca Tribal Council	8	3,106.7	7,676.8				
Fort McKay 174C	Fort McKay	Cree / Dene	Athabasca Tribal Council	8	3,381.4	8,355.6				
Fort McKay 174D	Fort McKay	Cree / Dene	Athabasca Tribal Council	8	660.8	1,632.9				
Fort Vermilion 173B	Tallcree First Nation	Woodland Cree	North Peace Tribal Council	8	49.7	122.8	96	97	-1.0%	
Fox Lake 162	Little Red River Cree	Woods Cree	North Peace Tribal Council	8	10,438.3	25,793.6	2,032	1,875	8.4%	
Gregoire Lake 176	Fort McMurray #468	Cree / Chipewyan	Athabasca Tribal Council	8	2,231.9	5,515.1	191	274	-30.3%	
Gregoire Lake 176A	Fort McMurray #468	Cree / Chipewyan	Athabasca Tribal Council	8	67.4	166.5	130	0		
Gregoire Lake 176B	Fort McMurray #468	Cree / Chipewyan	Athabasca Tribal Council	8	17.0	42.0				
Hay Lake 209	Dene Tha'	Slavey	North Peace Tribal Council	8	12,355.3	30,530.6	883	949	-7.0%	
Heart Lake 167	Heart Lake	Cree	Tribal Chiefs Ventures Incorporated	6	4,496.2	11,110.4	184	159	15.7%	
Heart Lake 167A	Heart Lake	Cree	Tribal Chiefs Ventures Incorporated	6	8.3	20.5				
Hokedhe Túe 196E	Smith's Landing	Chipewyan		8	440.4	1,088.3				INAC lists the reserve in Alberta and the band headquartered in Fort Smith, Northwest Territories
Horse Lakes 152B	Horse Lake	Cree / Dane-zaa	Western Cree Tribal Council	8	1,552.0	3,835.1	469	402	16.7%	
Jackfish Point 214	Dene Tha'	Slavey	North Peace Tribal Council	8	103.6	256.0				
Janvier 194	Chipewyan Prairie	Chipewyan	Athabasca Tribal Council	8	2,486.7	6,144.8	414	295	40.3%	
Jean Baptiste Gambler 183	Bigstone Cree	Woods Cree		8	198.7	491.0	253	254	-0.4%	
John D'Or Prairie 215	Little Red River Cree	Woods Cree	North Peace Tribal Council	8	14,034.0	34,678.8	1,196	1,123	6.5%	
K'i Túe 196D	Smith's Landing	Chipewyan		8	484.3	1,196.7				INAC lists the reserve in Alberta and the band headquartered in Fort Smith, Northwest Territories
Kapawe'no First Nation 150B	Kapawe'no	Woods Cree	Lesser Slave Lake Indian Regional Council	8	29.6	73.1	154	115	33.9%	
Kapawe'no First Nation 150C	Kapawe'no	Woods Cree	Lesser Slave Lake Indian Regional Council	8	21.0	51.9				
Kapawe'no First Nation 150D	Kapawe'no	Woods Cree	Lesser Slave Lake Indian Regional Council	8	390.1	964.0	5	5	0.0%	
Kapawe'no First Nation 229	Kapawe'no	Woods Cree	Lesser Slave Lake Indian Regional Council	8	129.0	318.8				
Kapawe'no First Nation 230	Kapawe'no	Woods Cree	Lesser Slave Lake Indian Regional Council	8	846.0	2,090.5				
Kapawe'no First Nation 231	Kapawe'no	Woods Cree	Lesser Slave Lake Indian Regional Council	8	147.0	363.2				
Kehewin 123	Kehewin Cree	Cree	Tribal Chiefs Ventures Incorporated	6	8,225.0	20,324.4	976	1,065	-8.4%	
Li Dezé 196C	Smith's Landing	Chipewyan		8	729.4	1,802.4				INAC lists the reserve in Alberta and the band headquartered in Fort Smith, Northwest Territories
Loon Lake 235	Loon River Cree	Woods Cree	Kee Tas Kee Now Tribal Council	8	6,902.3	17,056.0	555	511	8.6%	
Loon Prairie 237	Loon River Cree	Woods Cree	Kee Tas Kee Now Tribal Council	8	259.6	641.5				
Louis Bull 138B	Louis Bull	Beaver Hills Cree	Maskwacis Cree Tribal Council	6	3,388.1	8,372.2	1,177	1,309	-10.1%	
Makaoo 120	Onion Lake Cree	Cree		6	5,626.6	13,903.6	208	180	15.6%	Headquartered in Saskatchewan
Montana 139	Montana	Cree	Maskwacis Cree Tribal Council	6	2,824.8	6,980.2	630	653	-3.5%	
Namur Lake 174B	Fort McKay	Cree / Dene	Athabasca Tribal Council	8	3,122.2	7,715.1				
Namur River 174A	Fort McKay	Cree / Dene	Athabasca Tribal Council	8	4,614.9	11,403.7				
O'Chiese 203	O'Chiese	Anishinaabe	Yellowhead Tribal Development Foundation	6	14,131.9	34,920.7	789	751	5.1%	
O'Chiese Cemetery 203A	O'Chiese	Anishinaabe	Yellowhead Tribal Development Foundation	6	0.1	0.2				
Old Fort 217	Mikisew Cree	Woodland Cree		8	1,509.0	3,728.8				
Peace Point 222	Mikisew Cree	Woodland Cree		8	518.0	1,280.0				
Peerless Trout 238	Peerless Trout	Woods Cree	Kee Tas Kee Now Tribal Council	8	3,553.2	8,780.1				
Peigan Timber Limit "B"	Piikani	Piegan Blackfeet	Blackfoot Confederacy	7	2,978.6	7,360.3				
Pigeon Lake 138A	Ermineskin Tribe; Louis Bull; Montana; Samson	Beaver Hills Cree; Beaver Hills Cree; Cree; Beaver Hills Cree	Maskwacis Cree Tribal Council	6	1,921.1	4,747.1	429	485	-11.5%	
PiikanI	Piikani	Piegan Blackfeet	Blackfoot Confederacy	7	42,699.2	105,512.0	1,544	1,217	26.9%	
Puskiakiwenin 122	Frog Lake	Cree	Tribal Chiefs Ventures Incorporated	6	10,339.1	25,548.5	531	484	9.7%	
Saddle Lake 125	Saddle Lake Cree	Beaver Hills Cree		6	25,780.6	63,705.2	UN	UN	UN	
Samson 137	Samson	Beaver Hills Cree	Maskwacis Cree Tribal Council	6	13,552.0	33,487.7	3,373	3,746	-10.0%	
Samson 137A	Samson	Beaver Hills Cree	Maskwacis Cree Tribal Council	6	134.4	332.1	26	38	-31.6%	
Sandy Point 221	Mikisew Cree	Woodland Cree		8	204.0	504.1				
Sawridge 150G	Sawridge	Woods Cree	Lesser Slave Lake Indian Regional Council	8	906.5	2,240.0	20	48	-58.3%	
Sawridge 150H	Sawridge	Woods Cree	Lesser Slave Lake Indian Regional Council	8	1,236.8	3,056.2	10	20	-50.0%	
Siksika 146	Siksika	Piegan Blackfeet	Blackfoot Confederacy	7	71,087.5	175,661.0	3,479	2,972	17.1%	
Stoney 142-143-144	Bearspaw; Chiniki; Stoney; Wesley	Nakoda	Stoney Nakoda - Tsuut'ina Tribal Council	7	39,264.5	97,024.7	3,713	3,494	6.3%	
Stoney 142B	Bearspaw; Chiniki; Stoney; Wesley	Nakoda	Stoney Nakoda - Tsuut'ina Tribal Council	7	5,692.4	14,066.2				
Sturgeon Lake 154	Sturgeon Lake Cree	Woods Cree	Western Cree Tribal Council	8	14,814.3	36,606.9	1,447	1,162	24.5%	
Sturgeon Lake 154A	Sturgeon Lake Cree	Woods Cree	Western Cree Tribal Council	8	753.1	1,861.0	53	24	120.8%	
Sturgeon Lake 154B	Sturgeon Lake Cree	Woods Cree	Western Cree Tribal Council	8	97.1	239.9				
Sucker Creek 150A	Sucker Creek	Woods Cree	Lesser Slave Lake Indian Regional Council	8	5,987.0	14,794.2	689	677	1.8%	
Sunchild 202	Sunchild	Beaver Hills Cree	Yellowhead Tribal Development Foundation	6	5,218.1	12,894.2	749	677	10.6%	
Swampy Lake 236	Loon River Cree	Woods Cree	Kee Tas Kee Now Tribal Council	8	14,744.4	36,434.2	413	312	32.4%	
Swan River 150E	Swan River	Woods Cree	Lesser Slave Lake Indian Regional Council	8	4,271.1	10,554.1	250	202	23.8%	
Tall Cree 173	Tallcree First Nation	Woodland Cree	North Peace Tribal Council	8	4,031.5	9,962.1	224	163	37.4%	
Tall Cree 173A	Tallcree First Nation	Woodland Cree	North Peace Tribal Council	8	2,723.4	6,729.7	28	0		
Thabacha Náre 196A	Smith's Landing	Chipewyan		8	397.2	981.5	20	30	-33.3%	INAC lists the reserve in Alberta and the band headquartered in Fort Smith, Northwest Territories
Thebathi 196	Smith's Landing	Chipewyan		8	6,524.0	16,121.2				INAC lists the reserve in Alberta and the band headquartered in Fort Smith, Northwest Territories
Tsu K'adhe Túe 196F	Smith's Landing	Chipewyan		8	231.6	572.3				INAC lists the reserve in Alberta and the band headquartered in Fort Smith, Northwest Territories
Tsu Nedehe Tue 196H	Smith's Landing	Chipewyan		8	586.0	1,448.0				INAC lists the reserve in Alberta and the band headquartered in Fort Smith, Northwest Territories
Tsu Túe 196G	Smith's Landing	Chipewyan		8	42.7	105.5				INAC lists the reserve in Alberta and the band headquartered in Fort Smith, Northwest Territories
Tsuu T'ina Nation 145	Tsuut'ina	Dene	Stoney Nakoda - Tsuut'ina Tribal Council	7	29,417.4	72,692.0	1,643	2,052	-19.9%	
Tthejëre Ghaı̨lı̨ 196B	Smith's Landing	Chipewyan		8	401.1	991.1				INAC lists the reserve in Alberta and the band headquartered in Fort Smith, Northwest Territories
Unipouheos 121	Frog Lake	Cree	Tribal Chiefs Ventures Incorporated	6	8,506.3	21,019.5	909	813	11.8%	
Upper Hay River 212	Dene Tha'	Slavey	North Peace Tribal Council	8	1,418.0	3,504.0	294	292	0.7%	
Utikoomak Lake 155	Whitefish Lake	Woods Cree	Kee Tas Kee Now Tribal Council	8	6,756.1	16,694.7	723	644	12.3%	
Utikoomak Lake 155A	Whitefish Lake	Woods Cree	Kee Tas Kee Now Tribal Council	8	1,041.0	2,572.4	127	121	5.0%	
Utikoomak Lake 155B	Whitefish Lake	Woods Cree	Kee Tas Kee Now Tribal Council	8	502.6	1,242.0				
Wabamun 133A	Paul	Cree / Nakoda		6	6,116.9	15,115.2	1,592	1,069	48.9%	
Wabamun 133B	Paul	Cree / Nakoda		6	178.5	441.1	30	17	76.5%	
Wabasca 166	Bigstone Cree	Woods Cree		8	8,452.4	20,886.3	160	152	5.3%	
Wabasca 166A	Bigstone Cree	Woods Cree		8	682.1	1,685.5	658	738	-10.8%	
Wabasca 166B	Bigstone Cree	Woods Cree		8	2,413.4	5,963.6	190	250	-24.0%	
Wabasca 166C	Bigstone Cree	Woods Cree		8	3,502.6	8,655.1	188	182	3.3%	
Wabasca 166D	Bigstone Cree	Woods Cree		8	5,817.4	14,375.1	961	885	8.6%	
Wadlin Lake 173C	Tallcree First Nation	Woodland Cree	North Peace Tribal Council	8	48.0	118.6				
White Fish Lake 128	Saddle Lake Cree	Beaver Hills Cree		6	4,542.7	11,225.3	1,310	1,188	10.3%	
William McKenzie 151K	Duncan's	Woods Cree	Western Cree Tribal Council	8	389.3	962.0				
Winefred Lake 194B	Chipewyan Prairie	Chipewyan	Athabasca Tribal Council	8	450.0	1,112.0				
Woodland Cree 226	Woodland Cree	Woodland Cree	Kee Tas Kee Now Tribal Council	8	11,660.0	28,812.5	723	706	2.4%	
Woodland Cree 227	Woodland Cree	Woodland Cree	Kee Tas Kee Now Tribal Council	8	660.0	1,630.9				
Woodland Cree 228	Woodland Cree	Woodland Cree	Kee Tas Kee Now Tribal Council	8	3,786.0	9,355.4	150	143	4.9%	
Zama Lake 210	Dene Tha'	Slavey	North Peace Tribal Council	8	2,307.2	5,701.2				

== Manitoba ==
- A Kwis Ki Mahka Indian Reserve — Fox Lake Cree Nation
- Amik Wachink Sakahikan — Garden Hill First Nation
- Anderson — Norway House Cree Nation
- Andrew Bay — God's Lake First Nation
- Bella Lake Exchange Lands — Garden Hill First Nation
- Berens River 13 — Berens River First Nation
- Birch Landing — Brokenhead Ojibway Nation
- Birdtail Creek 57 — Birdtail Sioux First Nation
- Birdtail Hay Lands 57A — Birdtail Sioux First Nation
- Black River 9 — Black River First Nation
- Black Sturgeon — Marcel Colomb First Nation
- Bloodvein 12 — Bloodvein First Nation
- Bottle Lake 61B — Keeseekoowenin Ojibway First Nation
- Brochet 197 — Barren Lands First Nation, Brochet, Manitoba (pop. 308)
- Brokenhead 4 — Brokenhead Ojibway Nation
- Buffalo Point 36 — Buffalo Point First Nation, Buffalo Point, Manitoba
- Buffalo Point First Nation 1 — Buffalo Point First Nation
- Buffalo Point First Nation 2 — Buffalo Point First Nation
- Buffalo Point First Nation 3 — Buffalo Point First Nation
- Cantin Lake — St. Theresa Point First Nation
- Canupawakpa Dakota First Nation — Canupawakpa Dakota First Nation
- Channel Island Sapotaweyak Cree Nation — Sapotaweyak Cree Nation
- Chataway Lake/Knife Lake — God's Lake First Nation
- Chemawawin 1 — Chemawawin Cree Nation
- Chemawawin 2 — Chemawawin Cree Nation
- Chemawawin 3 — Chemawawin Cree Nation
- Chepi Lake Indian Reserve — Manto Sipi Cree Nation
- Churchill 1 — Sayisi Dene
- Clear Lake 61A — Keeseekoowenin Ojibway First Nation
- Crane River 51 — O-Chi-Chak-Ko-Sipi First Nation
- Cross Lake 19 — Cross Lake First Nation
- Cross Lake 19A — Cross Lake First Nation
- Cross Lake 19B — Cross Lake First Nation
- Cross Lake 19C — Cross Lake First Nation
- Cross Lake 19D — Cross Lake First Nation
- Cross Lake 19E — Cross Lake First Nation
- Cross Lake 19X01 — Cross Lake First Nation
- Cross Lake 19X02 — Cross Lake First Nation
- Cross Lake 19X03 — Cross Lake First Nation
- Cross Lake 19X05 — Cross Lake First Nation
- Cross Lake 19X06 — Cross Lake First Nation
- Dakota Plains 6A — Dakota Plains First Nation
- Dakota Tipi 1 — Dakota Tipi First Nation
- Dauphin River — Dauphin River First Nation
- Dog Creek 46 — Lake Manitoba First Nation
- Ebb And Flow 52 — Ebb and Flow First Nation
- Esker Ridge A Indian Reserve — God's Lake First Nation
- Esker Ridge B — God's Lake First Nation
- Fairford 50 — Pinaymootang First Nation
- Feather Rapids — Wasagamack First Nation
- Fisher River 44 — Fisher River Cree Nation
- Fisher River 44A — Fisher River Cree Nation
- Fishing Station 62A — Birdtail Sioux First Nation, Canupawakpa Dakota First Nation
- Fort Alexander 3 — Sagkeeng First Nation
- Fox Lake 1 — Fox Lake Cree Nation
- Fox Lake 2 — Fox Lake Cree Nation
- Fox Lake West 3 — Fox Lake Cree Nation
- Gambler 63 — Gamblers First Nation
- Garden Hill First Nation — Garden Hill First Nation
- Gillam Indian Settlement — Fox Lake Cree Nation, Gillam, Manitoba
- God's Lake 23 — God's Lake First Nation
- God's Lake Southeast of Community — God's Lake First Nation
- God's River 86A — Manto Sipi Cree Nation
- God's River Indian Settlement — Manto Sipi Cree Nation, Gods River, Manitoba
- Grand Rapids 33 — Misipawistik Cree Nation
- Granville Lake Indian Settlement — Mathias Colomb First Nation, Granville Lake, Manitoba
- Hart — Norway House Cree Nation
- Hawkins — God's Lake First Nation
- High Hill Lake — Bunibonibee Cree Nation
- Highrock 199 — Mathias Colomb First Nation
- Hole Or Hollow Water 10 — Hollow Water First Nation
- Hurley Island Indian Reserve — Manto Sipi Cree Nation
- Indian Gardens 8 — Swan Lake First Nation
- Jackhead 43 — Kinonjeoshtegon First Nation
- Jackhead 43A — Kinonjeoshtegon First Nation
- Kamihkowapihskak Pawistik — Mathias Colomb First Nation
- Kapawasihk — Nisichawayasihk Cree Nation
- Keeseekoowenin 61 — Keeseekoowenin Ojibway First Nation
- Kenyan Lake — God's Lake First Nation
- Kimosominahk — Mathias Colomb First Nation
- Kisipikamak — Bunibonibee Cree Nation
- Lac Brochet 197A — Northlands First Nation
- Little Grand Rapids 14 — Little Grand Rapids First Nation
- Little Saskatchewan 48 — Little Saskatchewan First Nation
- Little Saskatchewan 48B — Little Saskatchewan First Nation
- Long Plain 6 — Long Plain First Nation
- Mile 20 Second Revision — Nisichawayasihk Cree Nation
- Mistiategameek Sipi — Mathias Colomb First Nation
- Monahawuhkan — Nisichawayasihk Cree Nation
- Moose Lake 31A — Mosakahiken Cree Nation
- Moose Lake 31C — Mosakahiken Cree Nation
- Moose Lake 31D — Mosakahiken Cree Nation
- Moose Lake 31G — Mosakahiken Cree Nation
- Moose Lake 31J — Mosakahiken Cree Nation
- Mooseocoot — War Lake First Nation
- Mooseocoot 2 — War Lake First Nation
- Mooseocoot 3 — War Lake First Nation
- Moosowhapihsk Sakahegan — Mathias Colomb First Nation
- Mukwa Narrows — St. Theresa Point First Nation
- Munro Lake Indian Reserve — Bunibonibee Cree Nation
- Naawi-Oodena
- Na-Sha-Ke-Penais — Brokenhead Ojibway Nation
- Napahkapihskow Sakhahigan — Mathias Colomb First Nation
- Naytawunkank — Wasagamack First Nation
- Nelson House 170 — Nisichawayasihk Cree Nation
- Nelson House 170A — Nisichawayasihk Cree Nation
- Nelson House 170B — Nisichawayasihk Cree Nation
- Nelson House 170C — Nisichawayasihk Cree Nation
- Nihkik Ohnikapihs — Mathias Colomb First Nation
- North Prominent Ridge — God's Lake First Nation
- Northwest Angle 34C — Animakee Wa Zhing 37 First Nation
- Northwest Angle 37C — Animakee Wa Zhing 37 First Nation
- Norway House 17 — Norway House Cree Nation, Norway House, Manitoba (pop. 4,071)
- Norway House 17A — Norway House Cree Nation
- Norway House 17B — Norway House Cree Nation
- Norway House Indian Reserves — Norway House Cree Nation
- Norway House Indian Reserve No. 17D-1 — Norway House Cree Nation
- Norway House No. 17C-1≈46 — Norway House Cree Nation
- Notin Sakahekun — Bunibonibee Cree Nation
- Numaykoos Sakaheykun — Nisichawayasihk Cree Nation
- O-Pipon-Na-Piwin Cree Nation 1 — O-Pipon-Na-Piwin Cree Nation
- Oak Lake 59A — Canupawakpa Dakota First Nation
- Odei River — Nisichawayasihk Cree Nation
- Ohpahahpiskow Sakahegan — Mathias Colomb First Nation
- Opaskwayak Cree Nation 21 — Opaskwayak Cree Nation
- Opaskwayak Cree Nation 21A — Opaskwayak Cree Nation
- Opaskwayak Cree Nation 21A South — Opaskwayak Cree Nation
- Opaskwayak Cree Nation 21B~K — Opaskwayak Cree Nation
- Opaskwayak Cree Nation 21L — Opaskwayak Cree Nation
- Opaskwayak Cree Nation 21N — Opaskwayak Cree Nation
- Opaskwayak Cree Nation 21P — Opaskwayak Cree Nation
- Opaskwayak Cree Nation 27A — Opaskwayak Cree Nation
- Opaskwayak Cree Nation Egg Lake Indian Reserve#1 — Opaskwayak Cree Nation
- Opaskwayak Cree Nation Rocky Lake — Opaskwayak Cree Nation
- Opaskwayak Cree Nation Root Lake 231 — Opaskwayak Cree Nation
- Opaskwayak Cree Nation Salt Channel 21D — Opaskwayak Cree Nation
- Opekanowi Sakaheykun — Nisichawayasihk Cree Nation
- Opekunosakakanihk — Nisichawayasihk Cree Nation
- Opischikonayak Nation — Bunibonibee Cree Nation
- Overflowing River Sapotaweyak Cree Nation — Sapotaweyak Cree Nation
- Oxford House 24 — Bunibonibee Cree Nation
- Oxford House 24A~D — Bunibonibee Cree Nation
- Oxford Lake North Shore — Bunibonibee Cree Nation
- Pachapesihk Wasahow — Mathias Colomb First Nation
- Pauingassi First Nation — Pauingassi First Nation
- Pe-Ta-Waygamak — Garden Hill First Nation
- Peguis 1B — Peguis First Nation
- Peguis 1C — Peguis First Nation
- Peguis 1D — Peguis First Nation
- Peguis 1E — Peguis First Nation
- Peguis 1F — Peguis First Nation
- Peguis 1G — Peguis First Nation
- Peguis 1H — Peguis First Nation
- Peguis 1I — Peguis First Nation
- Pelican Rapids Access Road Phase — Sapotaweyak Cree Nation
- Peter Burton'S/Shorty Rapids — God's Lake First Nation
- Pigeon River 13A — Berens River First Nation
- Pine Creek 66A — Pine Creek First Nation
- Ponask Lake — Norway House Cree Nation
- Poplar River — Poplar River First Nation
- Prominent Ridge Indian Reserve — Manto Sipi Cree Nation
- Pth 10 Sapotaweyak Cree Nation — Sapotaweyak Cree Nation
- Pukatawagan 198 — Mathias Colomb First Nation
- Red Cross Lake East — God's Lake First Nation
- Red Cross Lake North — God's Lake First Nation
- Red Sucker Lake 1976 — Red Sucker Lake First Nation
- Red Sucker Lake No. 1976 A — Red Sucker Lake First Nation
- Red Sucker Lake No. 1976 B — Red Sucker Lake First Nation
- Red Sucker Lake No. 1976 C — Red Sucker Lake First Nation
- Red Sucker Lake No. 1976 D — Red Sucker Lake First Nation
- Red Sucker Lake No. 1976 F — Red Sucker Lake First Nation
- Red Sucker Lake No. 1976 H — Red Sucker Lake First Nation
- Reed River 36A — Buffalo Point First Nation
- Rolling River 67 — Rolling River First Nation
- Rolling River 67A — Rolling River First Nation
- Rolling River 67B — Rolling River First Nation
- Root Lake Beach Ridge Site Indian Reserve — Opaskwayak Cree Nation
- Roseau Rapids 2A — Roseau River Anishinabe First Nation
- Roseau River 2 — Roseau River Anishinabe First Nation
- Roseau River 2B — Roseau River Anishinabe First Nation
- Sandy Bay 5 — Sandy Bay First Nation
- Sapotaweyak Cree Nation — Sapotaweyak Cree Nation
- Sapotaweyak Cree Nation - Spruce Island — Sapotaweyak Cree Nation
- Seeseep Sakahikan — Garden Hill First Nation
- Shamattawa 1 — Shamattawa First Nation
- Shoal Lake 37A — Animakee Wa Zhing 37 First Nation
- Shoal River 65A — Sapotaweyak Cree Nation
- Shoal River 65B — Sapotaweyak Cree Nation
- Shoal River 65F — Sapotaweyak Cree Nation
- Sioux Valley Dakota Nation — Sioux Valley First Nation
- Sisipuk Sakahegan (A) — Mathias Colomb First Nation
- Sisipuk Sakahegan (B) — Mathias Colomb First Nation
- Sisipuk Sakahegan (C) — Mathias Colomb First Nation
- South Indian Lake Settlement — O-Pipon-Na-Piwin Cree Nation
- Split Lake 171 — Tataskweyak Cree Nation
- Split Lake 171A — Tataskweyak Cree Nation
- Split Lake 171B — Tataskweyak Cree Nation
- St Theresa Point — St. Theresa Point First Nation
- St. Peters Fishing Station 1A — Peguis First Nation
- Suwanne Lake — Nisichawayasihk Cree Nation
- Swan Lake 7 — Swan Lake First Nation, Swan Lake, Manitoba
- Swan Lake 7A — Swan Lake First Nation
- Swan Lake First Nation 8A — Swan Lake First Nation
- Wuskwi Sipihk First Nation Swan Lake 65C — Wuskwi Sipihk First Nation (pop. 197)
- Sheth Chok— Northlands First Nation
- Suwannee Lake — Nisichawayasihk Cree Nation
- Tadoule Lake — Sayisi Dene
- The Narrows 49 — Lake St. Martin First Nation
- The Narrows 49A — Lake St. Martin First Nation
- Thuycholeeni — Northlands First Nation
- Thuycholeeni Azé — Northlands First Nation
- Tthekalé Nu — Northlands First Nation
- Valley River 63A — Tootinaowaziibeeng Treaty Reserve First Nation
- Vermilyea Lake — God's Lake First Nation
- Wapaminakoskak Narrows — God's Lake First Nation
- Wapasihk — Nisichawayasihk Cree Nation
- Wapisew Lake — Bunibonibee First Nation
- Wapisu Lake — Nisichawayasihk Cree Nation
- Wasagamack — Wasagamack First Nation
- Waterhen 45 — Skownan First Nation
- Waywayseecappo First Nation — Waywayseecappo First Nation
- Wepuskow Ohnikahp — Mathias Colomb First Nation
- Wesha Kijay Wasagamach — Garden Hill First Nation
- Whiskeyjack — Cross Lake First Nation
- Whitemud Lake — Bunibonibee Cree Nation
- Winnipekosihk — Norway House Cree Nation
- Wolf River — Garden Hill First Nation
- Wuskwi Sakaheykun — Nisichawayasihk Cree Nation
- Wuskwi Sipi — Nisichawayasihk Cree Nation
- Wuskwi Sipihk 4 — Wuskwi Sipihk First Nation
- Wuskwi Sipihk 5 — Wuskwi Sipihk First Nation
- Wuskwi Sipihk 6 — Wuskwi Sipihk First Nation
- Wuskwi Sipihk 8 — Wuskwi Sipihk First Nation
- Wuskwi Sipihk First Nation 2 — Wuskwi Sipihk First Nation
- Wuskwi Sipihk First Nation 3A~F — Wuskwi Sipihk First Nation
- Wuskwi Sipihk First Nation No. 1 — Wuskwi Sipihk First Nation
- Wuskwi Sipihk No. 7 — Wuskwi Sipihk First Nation
- Wapikunoo Bay — Nisichawayasihk Cree Nation
- York Landing — York Factory First Nation

== New Brunswick ==
Name as used by Indigenous and Northern Affairs Canada	First Nation(s)	Ethnic/national group	Tribal council	Treaty	Area		Population			Notes & references
Name as used by Indigenous and Northern Affairs Canada	First Nation(s)	Ethnic/national group	Tribal council	Treaty	ha	acre	2016	2011	% difference	Notes & references
Big Hole Tract 8 (North Half)	Metepenagiag Miꞌkmaq	Miꞌkmaq	North Shore Micmac District Council	n/a	1,396.2	3,450.1				
Big Hole Tract 8 (South Half)	Natoaganeg	Miꞌkmaq	North Shore Micmac District Council	n/a	1,740.2	4,300.1	48	34	41.2%	
Buctouche 16	Buctouche MicMac	Miꞌkmaq	North Shore Micmac District Council	n/a	62.3	153.9	96	85	12.9%	
Buctouche Micmac Band Extension	Buctouche MicMac	Miꞌkmaq	North Shore Micmac District Council	n/a	89.6	221.4				
Devon 30	Saint Mary's	Wolastoqiyik	Wolastoqey Tribal Council	n/a	125.9	311.1	1,038	864	20.1%	
Eel Ground 2	Natoaganeg	Miꞌkmaq	North Shore Micmac District Council	n/a	1,072.8	2,650.9	532	448	18.8%	
Eel River 3	Eel River Bar	Miꞌkmaq	North Shore Micmac District Council	n/a	122.0	301.5	329	320	2.8%	
Esgenoôpetitj	Esgenoopetitj	Miꞌkmaq	Mawiw Council Incorporated	n/a	985.4	2,435.0	1,179	1,046	12.7%	
Fort Folly 1	Fort Folly	Miꞌkmaq	North Shore Micmac District Council	n/a	56.1	138.6	40	48	-16.7%	
Indian Island 28	Indian Island	Miꞌkmaq	North Shore Micmac District Council	n/a	38.4	94.9	138	97	42.3%	
Indian Point 1	Metepenagiag Miꞌkmaq	Miꞌkmaq	North Shore Micmac District Council	n/a	41.2	101.8				
Indian Ranch	Eel River Bar	Miꞌkmaq	North Shore Micmac District Council	n/a	45.7	112.9	89	60	48.3%	
Kingsclear 6	Kingsclear	Maliseet	Wolastoqey Tribal Council	n/a	374.7	925.9	493	490	0.6%	
Metepenagiag Urban Reserve 3	Metepenagiag Miꞌkmaq	Miꞌkmaq	North Shore Micmac District Council	n/a	19.9	49.2				
Metepenagiag Urban Reserve 8	Metepenagiag Miꞌkmaq	Miꞌkmaq	North Shore Micmac District Council	n/a	3.6	8.9				
Metepenagiag Uta'nk	Metepenagiag Miꞌkmaq	Miꞌkmaq	North Shore Micmac District Council	n/a	1.1	2.7				
Moose Meadows 4	Eel River Bar	Miꞌkmaq	North Shore Micmac District Council	n/a	404.7	1,000.0				
Oinpegitjoig	Pabineau	Miꞌkmaq	North Shore Micmac District Council	n/a	18.6	46.0				
Oromocto 26	Oromocto	Wolastoqiyik	Wolastoqey Tribal Council	n/a	100.7	248.8	282	286	-1.4%	
Pabineau 11	Pabineau	Miꞌkmaq	North Shore Micmac District Council	n/a	429.1	1,060.3	134	141	-5%	
Pokemouche 13	Esgenoopetitj	Miꞌkmaq	Mawiw Council Incorporated	n/a	151.4	374.1				
Red Bank 4	Metepenagiag Miꞌkmaq	Miꞌkmaq	North Shore Micmac District Council	n/a	1,457.0	3,600.3	309	352	-12.2%	
Red Bank 7	Metepenagiag Miꞌkmaq	Miꞌkmaq	North Shore Micmac District Council	n/a	1,011.7	2,500.0				
Renous 12	Natoaganeg	Miꞌkmaq	North Shore Micmac District Council	n/a	10.0	24.7				
Richibucto 15	Elsipogtog	Miꞌkmaq	Mawiw Council Incorporated	n/a	1,956.2	4,833.9	1,937	1,985	-2.4%	
Soegao No. 35	Elsipogtog	Miꞌkmaq	Mawiw Council Incorporated	n/a	130.1	321.5				
St Basile 10	Madawaska Maliseet	Maliseet	Wolastoqey Tribal Council	n/a	344.8	852.0	214	205	4.4%	
St. Mary's 24	Saint Mary's	Wolastoqiyik	Wolastoqey Tribal Council	n/a	1.0	2.5				
Tabusintac 9	Esgenoopetitj	Miꞌkmaq	Mawiw Council Incorporated	n/a	3,268.7	8,077.1	10	10	0%	
The Brothers 18	Kingsclear; Madawaska Maliseet; Tobique; Woodstock	Maliseet	Wolastoqey Tribal Council; Wolastoqey Tribal Council; Mawiw Council Incorporated —	n/a	4.0	9.9				
Tobique 20	Tobique	Maliseet	Mawiw Council Incorporated	n/a	2,724.0	6,731.2	968	1,039	-6.8%	
Woodstock 23	Woodstock	Maliseet	—	n/a	159.8	394.9	327	345	-5.2%	

== Newfoundland and Labrador ==
Name as used by Indigenous and Northern Affairs Canada	First Nation(s)	Ethnic/national group	Tribal council	Treaty	Area		Population			Notes
Name as used by Indigenous and Northern Affairs Canada	First Nation(s)	Ethnic/national group	Tribal council	Treaty	ha	acre	2016	2011	% difference	Notes
Natuashish 2	Mushuau Innu	Naskapi	—	n/a	4,267.3	10,544.7	936	931	0.5%	
Samiajij Miawpukek	Miawpukek	Miꞌkmaq	—	n/a	2,839.0	7,015.3	956	920	3.9%	
Sheshatshiu 3	Sheshatshiu Innu	Innu	—	n/a	804.0	1,986.7	1,023	1,314	-22.1%	

=== Notes ===
The Inuit self-governing region of Nunatsiavut, the unrecognized Inuit territory of NunatuKavut and Nitassinan, the ancestral homeland of the Innu, are also located in Labrador. The Qalipu Mi'kmaq, a Miꞌkmaq people, have passed the final stages of obtaining Status under the Indian Act, and since 2011 has been a recognized band in Newfoundland.

== Nova Scotia ==
Name as used by Indigenous and Northern Affairs Canada	First Nation(s)	Ethnic/national group	Tribal council	Treaty	Area		Population			Notes
Name as used by Indigenous and Northern Affairs Canada	First Nation(s)	Ethnic/national group	Tribal council	Treaty	ha	acre	2016	2011	% difference	Notes
Annapolis Valley First Nation Reserve	Annapolis Valley	Miꞌkmaq	Confederacy of Mainland Mi'kmaq	n/a	59.0	145.8	140	144	-2.8%	
Bear River 6	Bear River	Miꞌkmaq	Confederacy of Mainland Mi'kmaq	n/a	633.8	1,566.2	138	102	35.3%	
Bear River 6A	Bear River	Miꞌkmaq	Confederacy of Mainland Mi'kmaq	n/a	31.2	77.1	0	0		
Bear River 6B	Bear River	Miꞌkmaq	Confederacy of Mainland Mi'kmaq	n/a	24.3	60.0	16	0		
Beaver Lake 17	Millbrook	Miꞌkmaq	Confederacy of Mainland Mi'kmaq	n/a	49.4	122.1	21	23	-8.7%	
Boat Harbour West 37	Pictou Landing	Miꞌkmaq	Confederacy of Mainland Mi'kmaq	n/a	98.2	242.7				
Caribou Marsh 29	Membertou	Miꞌkmaq	Union of Nova Scotia Mi'kmaq-Advisory Services	n/a	219.3	541.9				
Chapel Island 5	Potlotek	Miꞌkmaq	Union of Nova Scotia Mi'kmaq-Advisory Services	n/a	592.5	1,464.1	506	481	5.2%	
Cole Harbour 30	Millbrook	Miꞌkmaq	Confederacy of Mainland Mi'kmaq	n/a	18.6	46.0	203	194	4.6%	
Eskasoni 3	Eskasoni	Miꞌkmaq	Union of Nova Scotia Mi'kmaq-Advisory Services	n/a	3,591.1	8,873.8	3,422	3,309	3.4%	
Eskasoni 3A	Eskasoni	Miꞌkmaq	Union of Nova Scotia Mi'kmaq-Advisory Services	n/a	28.5	70.4				
Fisher's Grant 24	Pictou Landing	Miꞌkmaq	Confederacy of Mainland Mi'kmaq	n/a	142.7	352.6	485	467	3.9%	
Fisher's Grant 24G	Pictou Landing	Miꞌkmaq	Confederacy of Mainland Mi'kmaq	n/a	60.0	148.3				
Franklin Manor No.22 (Part)	Paqtnkek Mi'kmaw; Pictou Landing	Miꞌkmaq	Confederacy of Mainland Mi'kmaq	n/a	212.5	525.1				
Glooscap 35	Glooscap	Miꞌkmaq	Confederacy of Mainland Mi'kmaq	n/a	171.1	422.8	81	59	37.3%	
Glooscap Landing	Glooscap	Miꞌkmaq	Confederacy of Mainland Mi'kmaq	n/a	8.3	20.5	0	0	0%	
Gold River 21	Acadia	Miꞌkmaq	Confederacy of Mainland Mi'kmaq	n/a	270.2	667.7	95	77	23.4%	
Hammonds Plains	Acadia	Miꞌkmaq	Confederacy of Mainland Mi'kmaq	n/a	4.9	12.1				
Indian Brook 14	Sipekneꞌkatik	Miꞌkmaq	Confederacy of Mainland Mi'kmaq	n/a	1,234.2	3,049.8	1,089	1,084	0.5%	
Malagawatch 4	Eskasoni; Membertou; Potlotek; Wagmatcook; We'koqma'q	Miꞌkmaq	Union of Nova Scotia Mi'kmaq-Advisory Services	n/a	661.3	1,634.1				
Margaree 25	Wagmatcook	Miꞌkmaq	Union of Nova Scotia Mi'kmaq-Advisory Services	n/a	0.8	2.0				
Medway River 11	Acadia	Miꞌkmaq	Confederacy of Mainland Mi'kmaq	n/a	4.7	11.6				
Membertou 28B	Membertou	Miꞌkmaq	Union of Nova Scotia Mi'kmaq-Advisory Services	n/a	117.9	291.3	1,015	912	11.3%	
Merigomish Harbour 31	Pictou Landing	Miꞌkmaq	Confederacy of Mainland Mi'kmaq	n/a	14.2	35.1	0	0		
Millbrook 27	Millbrook	Miꞌkmaq	Confederacy of Mainland Mi'kmaq	n/a	302.3	747.0	860	847	1.5%	
New Ross 20	Sipekneꞌkatik	Miꞌkmaq	Confederacy of Mainland Mi'kmaq	n/a	408.3	1,008.9	0	0		
Paqtnkek-Niktuek No. 23	Paqtnkek Mi'kmaw	Miꞌkmaq	Confederacy of Mainland Mi'kmaq	n/a	204.8	506.1	353	373	-5.4%	
Pennal 19	Sipekneꞌkatik	Miꞌkmaq	Confederacy of Mainland Mi'kmaq	n/a	43.0	106.3	27	22	22.7%	
Ponhook Lake 10	Acadia	Miꞌkmaq	Confederacy of Mainland Mi'kmaq	n/a	101.8	251.6	15	10	50.0%	
Sheet Harbour 36	Millbrook	Miꞌkmaq	Confederacy of Mainland Mi'kmaq	n/a	30.4	75.1	25	15	66.7%	
Shubenacadie 13	Sipekneꞌkatik	Miꞌkmaq	Confederacy of Mainland Mi'kmaq	n/a	412.0	1,018.1	0	0		
St. Croix 34	Annapolis Valley	Miꞌkmaq	Confederacy of Mainland Mi'kmaq	n/a	126.2	311.8				
Sydney 28A	Membertou	Miꞌkmaq	Union of Nova Scotia Mi'kmaq-Advisory Services	n/a	5.1	12.6				
Truro 27A	Millbrook	Miꞌkmaq	Confederacy of Mainland Mi'kmaq	n/a	16.7	41.3				
Truro 27B	Millbrook	Miꞌkmaq	Confederacy of Mainland Mi'kmaq	n/a	16.4	40.5				
Truro 27C	Millbrook	Miꞌkmaq	Confederacy of Mainland Mi'kmaq	n/a	9.5	23.5				
Tufts Cove Indian Reserve	Millbrook	Miꞌkmaq	Confederacy of Mainland Mi'kmaq	n/a	4.0	9.9				
Wagmatcook 1	Wagmatcook	Miꞌkmaq	Union of Nova Scotia Mi'kmaq-Advisory Services	n/a	388.6	960.3	537	518	3.7%	
Wallace Hills No. 14A	Sipekneꞌkatik	Miꞌkmaq	Confederacy of Mainland Mi'kmaq	n/a	54.8	135.4	10	10	0.0%	
Welnek No. 38	Paqtnkek Mi'kmaw	Miꞌkmaq	Confederacy of Mainland Mi'kmaq	n/a	43.4	107.2				
Whycocomagh 2	We'koqma'q First	Miꞌkmaq	Union of Nova Scotia Mi'kmaq-Advisory Services	n/a	908.0	2,243.7	831	800	3.9%	
Wildcat 12	Acadia First Nation	Miꞌkmaq	Confederacy of Mainland Mi'kmaq	n/a	465.4	1,150.0	29	33	-12.1%	
Yarmouth 33	Acadia First Nation	Miꞌkmaq	Confederacy of Mainland Mi'kmaq	n/a	27.7	68.4	157	157	0.0%	

== Northwest Territories ==
Name as used by Indigenous and Northern Affairs Canada	First Nation(s)	Ethnic/national group	Tribal council	Treaty	Area		Population			Notes & references
Name as used by Indigenous and Northern Affairs Canada	First Nation(s)	Ethnic/national group	Tribal council	Treaty	ha	acre	2016	2011	% difference	Notes & references
Hay River Dene 1	K'atlodeeche	Slavey	Dehcho First Nations	8	13,517.4	33,402.2	309	292	5.8%	
Salt Plains 195	Salt River #195	Dene	Akaitcho Territory Government	8	44.7	110.5	0	0	%	The Salt River First Nation also has Fitzgerald No. 196, a 3,715.0 ha (9,180 acres) reserve in Alberta.
Salt River No. 195	Salt River #195	Dene	Akaitcho Territory Government	8	40,353.3	99,715.2				The Salt River First Nation also has Fitzgerald No. 196, a 3,715.0 ha (9,180 acres) reserve in Alberta.

There are only three actual Indian reserves in the Northwest Territories, Hay River Dene 1, Salt River 195 and Salt Plains 195. All other places are Indian settlements. The Smith's Landing First Nation is, according to INAC, headquartered in the NWT but are listed as an Alberta First Nations. Not included are Enterprise (predominantly non-Aboriginal (57.1%), 23.8% First Nations, 9.5% Métis, 9.5% Inuit) and Norman Wells (predominantly non-Aboriginal (58.3%), 25.8% First Nations, 11.3% Métis, 2.0% Inuit and 3.9% other Aboriginal). Also not included are the Inuvialuit communities of Paulatuk, Sachs Harbour Tuktoyaktuk and Ulukhaktok. Of these only Tuktoyaktuk reported a First Nations presence (1.7%).

== Ontario ==
Indian reserve	Government/band	Tribal council	Ethnic/national group	Communities	Comments
Abitibi 70	Wahgoshig First Nation, Abitibiwinni First Nation	Wabun Tribal Council	Algonquin, Cree, Ojibwe		Shared between two First Nations
Agency 1	Couchiching First Nation, Mitaanjigamiing First Nation, Naicatchewenin First Nation, Nigigoonsiminikaaning First Nation		Anishinaabe, Ojibwe, Saulteaux		Shared between four First Nations
Agency 30	Animakee Wa Zhing 37 First Nation, Anishinabe of Wauzhushk Onigum, Anishnaabeg of Naongashiing, Big Grassy First Nation, Buffalo Point First Nation, Iskatewizaagegan 39 Independent First Nation, Naotkamegwanning First Nation, Northwest Angle 33 First Nation, Obashkaandagaang Bay First Nation, Niisaachewan Anishinaabe Nation, Ojibways of Onigaming First Nation, Shoal Lake 40 First Nation, Wabaseemoong Independent Nations		Anishinaabe, Ojibwe, Saulteaux		Shared between 13 First Nations
Akwesasne 59	Mohawk Nation at Akwesasne		Mohawk	Kawehno:ke, Pilon Island	
Alderville	Alderville First Nation	Ogemawahj Tribal Council	Mississauga		
Armstrong	Whitesand First Nation	Independent First Nations Alliance	Ojibwe		Indian settlement
Aroland 83	Aroland First Nation	Matawa First Nations	Ojibwe, Oji-Cree		Indian settlement
Assabaska	Big Grassy First Nation, Ojibways of Onigaming First Nation	Anishinabeg of Kabapikotawangag Resource Council	Saulteaux		Shared between two First Nations
Attawapiskat 91	Attawapiskat First Nation	Mushkegowuk Council	Cree		
Attawapiskat 91A	Attawapiskat First Nation	Mushkegowuk Council	Cree		
Bear Island 1	Temagami First Nation		Anishinaabe		
Bearskin Lake	Bearskin Lake First Nation	Windigo First Nations Council	Oji-Cree		
Big Grassy River 35G	Big Grassy First Nation	Anishinabeg of Kabapikotawangag Resource Council	Saulteaux		
Big Island 31D	Anishnaabeg of Naongashiing	Anishinabeg of Kabapikotawangag Resource Council	Anishinaabe		
Big Island 31E	Anishnaabeg of Naongashiing	Anishinabeg of Kabapikotawangag Resource Council	Anishinaabe		
Big Island 31F	Anishnaabeg of Naongashiing	Anishinabeg of Kabapikotawangag Resource Council	Anishinaabe		
Big Island 37	Animakee Wa Zhing 37 First Nation	Anishinabeg of Kabapikotawangag Resource Council	Anishinaabe		
Big Island Mainland 93	Anishnaabeg of Naongashiing	Anishinabeg of Kabapikotawangag Resource Council	Anishinaabe		
Cape Croker Hunting Ground 60B	Chippewas of Nawash Unceded First Nation		Ojibwe		Unceded territory
Cat Lake 63C	Cat Lake First Nation	Windigo First Nations Council	Ojibwe	Cat Lake	
Chapleau 61	Michipicoten First Nation	Union of Ontario Indians	Ojibwe		
Chapleau 61A	Chapleau Ojibway First Nation	Wabun Tribal Council	Ojibwe		
Chapleau 74	Chapleau Ojibway First Nation	Wabun Tribal Council	Ojibwe		
Chapleau 74A	Chapleau Ojibway First Nation	Wabun Tribal Council	Ojibwe		
Chapleau 75	Chapleau Cree First Nation	Mushkegowuk Council	Cree		
Chapleau Cree Fox Lake	Chapleau Cree First Nation	Mushkegowuk Council	Cree		
Chief's Point 28	Saugeen First Nation		Ojibwe		Unceded territory
Chippewa Island	Beausoleil First Nation, Chippewas of Georgina Island First Nation, Chippewas of Rama First Nation	Ogemawahj Tribal Council	Odawa, Ojibwe, Potawatomi		Shared between three First Nations
Chippewas of the Thames First Nation 42	Chippewas of the Thames First Nation	Union of Ontario Indians	Ojibwe		
Chippewas of Georgina Island First Nation	Chippewas of Georgina Island First Nation	Ogemawahj Tribal Council	Ojibwe		
Chippewas of Georgina Island First Nation 33A	Chippewas of Georgina Island First Nation	Ogemawahj Tribal Council	Ojibwe		
Christian Island 30	Beausoleil First Nation	Ogemawahj Tribal Council	Odawa, Ojibwe, Potawatomi		
Christian Island 30A	Beausoleil First Nation	Ogemawahj Tribal Council	Odawa, Ojibwe, Potawatomi		
Constance Lake 92	Constance Lake First Nation	Matawa First Nations	Oji-Cree		
Couchiching 16A	Couchiching First Nation	Pwi-Di-Goo-Zing Ne-Yaa-Zhing Advisory Services	Saulteaux		
Curve Lake 35A	Curve Lake First Nation	Union of Ontario Indians	Mississauga		
Curve Lake First Nation 35	Curve Lake First Nation	Union of Ontario Indians	Mississauga		
Deer Lake	Deer Lake First Nation	Keewaytinook Okimakanak Council	Oji-Cree		
Dokis 9	Dokis First Nation	Waabnoong Bemjiwang Association of First Nations	Anishinaabe		
Duck Lake 76B	Brunswick House First Nation	Wabun Tribal Council	Cree, Ojibwe		
Eagle Lake 27	Eagle Lake First Nation	Bimose Tribal Council	Ojibwe		
English River 21	Asubpeeschoseewagong First Nation	Bimose Tribal Council	Ojibwe		
English River 66	Constance Lake First Nation	Matawa First Nations	Oji-Cree		
Factory Island 1	Moose Cree First Nation	Mushkegowuk Council	Cree		
Flying Post 73	Flying Post First Nation	Wabun Tribal Council	Cree, Ojibwe		
Fort Albany	Fort Albany First Nation	Mushkegowuk Council	Cree, Ojibwe		Indian settlement
Fort Albany 67	Fort Albany First Nation, Kashechewan First Nation	Mushkegowuk Council	Cree, Ojibwe		Shared between two First Nations
Fort Hope 64	Eabametoong First Nation	Matawa First Nations	Ojibwe		
Fort Severn	Fort Severn First Nation	Keewaytinook Okimakanak Council	Cree		Indian settlement
Fort Severn 89	Fort Severn First Nation	Keewaytinook Okimakanak Council	Cree		
Fort William 52	Fort William First Nation	Nokiiwin Tribal Council	Ojibwe		
French River 13	Henvey Inlet First Nation	Waabnoong Bemjiwang Association of First Nations	Ojibwe		
Garden River 14	Garden River First Nation	Union of Ontario Indians	Ojibwe		
Ginoogaming First Nation	Ginoogaming First Nation	Matawa First Nations	Anishinaabe		Formerly Long Lake 77
Glebe Farm 40B	Bearfoot Onondaga First Nation, Delaware First Nation, Konadaha Seneca First Nation, Lower Cayuga First Nation, Lower Mohawk First Nation, Mohawks of the Bay of Quinte First Nation, Niharondasa Seneca First Nation, Oneida First Nation, Onondaga Clear Sky First Nation, Tuscarora First Nation, Upper Cayuga First Nation, Upper Mohawk First Nation, Walker Mohawk First Nation		Cayuga, Lenape, Mohawk, Oneida, Onondaga, Seneca, Tuscarora		Shared between 13 First Nations
Goulais Bay 15A	Batchewana First Nation	Association of Iroquois and Allied Indians	Ojibwe	Goulais Mission	
Goulais Bay 15C	Batchewana First Nation	Association of Iroquois and Allied Indians	Ojibwe		Former reserve
Gros Cap 49	Michipicoten First Nation	Union of Ontario Indians	Ojibwe		
Gros Cap Indian Village 49A	Michipicoten First Nation	Union of Ontario Indians	Ojibwe		
Gull River 55	Gull Bay First Nation	Nokiiwin Tribal Council	Anishinaabe		
Henvey Inlet 2	Henvey Inlet First Nation	Waabnoong Bemjiwang Association of First Nations	Ojibwe		
Hiawatha First Nation	Hiawatha First Nation	Association of Iroquois and Allied Indians	Ojibwe		
Indian River	Chippewas of Rama First Nation, Wahta Mohawks		Mohawk, Ojibwe		Shared between two First Nations
Islands in the Trent Waters 36A	Curve Lake First Nation, Hiawatha First Nation, Mississaugas of Scugog Island First Nation		Mississauga, Ojibwe		Shared between three First Nations
Kasabonika Lake	Kasabonika Lake First Nation	Shibogama First Nations Council	Oji-Cree		
Kashechewan	Kashechewan First Nation	Mushkegowuk Council	Cree		Indian settlement
Kee Way Win	Keewaywin First Nation	Keewaytinook Okimakanak Council	Oji-Cree		Indian settlement
Kee-Way-Win	Keewaywin First Nation	Keewaytinook Okimakanak Council	Oji-Cree		
Kenora 38B	Anishinabe of Wauzhushk Onigum	Anishinabeg of Kabapikotawangag Resource Council	Anishinaabe		
Kettle Point 44	Chippewas of Kettle and Stony Point First Nation	Union of Ontario Indians	Anishinaabe		
Kingfisher 2A	Kingfisher First Nation	Shibogama First Nations Council	Oji-Cree		
Kingfisher 3A	Kingfisher First Nation	Shibogama First Nations Council	Oji-Cree		
Kingfisher Lake 1	Kingfisher First Nation	Shibogama First Nations Council	Oji-Cree		
Kitchenuhmaykoosib Aaki 84	Kitchenuhmaykoosib Inninuwug First Nation	Independent First Nations Alliance	Oji-Cree		
Lac des Mille Lacs 22A1	Lac des Mille Lacs First Nation	Bimose Tribal Council	Saulteaux		
Lac des Mille Lacs 22A2	Lac des Mille Lacs First Nation	Bimose Tribal Council	Saulteaux		Formerly Seine River 22A2
Lac Seul 28	Lac Seul First Nation	Independent First Nations Alliance	Ojibwe	Frenchmen's Head, Kejick Bay, Whitefish Bay	
Lake Helen 53A	Red Rock Indian Band	Union of Ontario Indians	Ojibwe		
Lake Nipigon	Animbiigoo Zaagi'igan Anishinaabek First Nation	Nokiiwin Tribal Council	Ojibwe		
Lake of the Woods 31B	Anishnaabeg of Naongashiing	Anishinabeg of Kabapikotawangag Resource Council	Anishinaabe		
Lake of the Woods 31C	Anishnaabeg of Naongashiing	Anishinabeg of Kabapikotawangag Resource Council	Anishinaabe		
Lake of the Woods 31G	Anishnaabeg of Naongashiing	Anishinabeg of Kabapikotawangag Resource Council	Anishinaabe		
Lake of the Woods 31H	Anishnaabeg of Naongashiing	Anishinabeg of Kabapikotawangag Resource Council	Anishinaabe		
Lake of the Woods 34	Animakee Wa Zhing 37 First Nation	Anishinabeg of Kabapikotawangag Resource Council	Anishinaabe		
Lake of the Woods 35J	Big Grassy First Nation	Anishinabeg of Kabapikotawangag Resource Council	Saulteaux		
Lake of the Woods 37	Animakee Wa Zhing 37 First Nation	Anishinabeg of Kabapikotawangag Resource Council	Anishinaabe		
Lake of the Woods 37B	Animakee Wa Zhing 37 First Nation	Anishinabeg of Kabapikotawangag Resource Council	Anishinaabe		
Long Lake 58	Long Lake 58 First Nation	Matawa First Nations	Anishinaabe		
Long Sault 12	Rainy River First Nations	Pwi-Di-Goo-Zing Ne-Yaa-Zhing Advisory Services	Saulteaux		
Magnetawan 1	Magnetawan First Nation	Waabnoong Bemjiwang Association of First Nations	Ojibwe		
Manitou Rapids 11	Rainy River First Nations	Pwi-Di-Goo-Zing Ne-Yaa-Zhing Advisory Services	Saulteaux		
Marten Falls 65	Marten Falls First Nation	Matawa First Nations	Anishinaabe	Marten Falls, Ogoki Post	
Matachewan 72	Matachewan First Nation	Wabun Tribal Council	Cree, Ojibwe		
Mattagami 71	Mattagami First Nation	Wabun Tribal Council	Odawa, Ojibwe, Oji-Cree		
M'Chigeeng 22	M'Chigeeng First Nation	United Chiefs and Councils of Manitoulin	Ojibwe		Formerly West Bay 22
Missanabie 62	Michipicoten First Nation	Union of Ontario Indians	Ojibwe		
Mississagi River 8	Mississauga First Nation		Mississauga		
Mississaugas of Scugog Island	Mississaugas of Scugog Island First Nation	Ogemawahj Tribal Council	Mississauga		
Mnjikaning First Nation 32	Chippewas of Rama First Nation	Ogemawahj Tribal Council	Anishinaabe		
Moose Factory 68	Moose Cree First Nation	Mushkegowuk Council	Cree		
Moose Point 79	Moose Deer Point First Nation	Ogemawahj Tribal Council	Potawatomi		
Monrovian 47	Delaware Nation at Monroviantown		Lenape		
Mountbatten 76A	Brunswick House First Nation	Wabun Tribal Council	Cree, Ojibwe		
Munsee-Delaware Nation 1	Munsee-Delaware Nation	Association of Iroquois and Allied Indians	Lenape		
Muskrat Dam Lake	Muskrat Dam Lake First Nation	Independent First Nations Alliance	Oji-Cree	Muskrat Dam	
Naiscoutaing 17A	Shawanaga First Nation		Anishinaabe		
Naongashing 31A	Anishnaabeg of Naongashiing	Anishinabeg of Kabapikotawangag Resource Council	Anishinaabe		
Naongashing 35A	Big Grassy First Nation	Anishinabeg of Kabapikotawangag Resource Council	Saulteaux		
Neguaguon Lake 25D	Lac La Croix First Nation	Pwi-Di-Goo-Zing Ne-Yaa-Zhing Advisory Services	Saulteaux		
Neskantaga	Neskantaga First Nation	Matawa First Nations	Oji-Cree	Lansdowne House	
New Credit 40A	Mississaugas of the New Credit First Nation	Association of Iroquois and Allied Indians	Mississauga		
New Post 69	Taykwa Tagamou Nation	Mushkegowuk Council	Cree		
New Post 69A	Taykwa Tagamou Nation	Mushkegowuk Council	Cree		
Neyaashiinigmiing 27	Chippewas of Nawash Unceded First Nation		Ojibwe		Unceded territory
Niisaachewan Anishinaabe Nation	Niisaachewan Anishinaabe Nation	Bimose Tribal Council	Anishinaabe		
Nipissing 10	Nipissing First Nation	Waabnoong Bemjiwang Association of First Nations	Algonquin, Ojibwe	Beaucage, Duchesnay, Garden Village, Jocko Point	
North Spirit Lake	North Spirit Lake First Nation	Keewaytinook Okimakanak Council	Oji-Cree		
Northwest Angle 33B	Northwest Angle 33 First Nation	Anishinabeg of Kabapikotawangag Resource Council	Saulteaux	Angle Inlet	
Northwest Angle 34C & 37B	Animakee Wa Zhing 37 First Nation	Anishinabeg of Kabapikotawangag Resource Council	Anishinaabe		
Obabikong 35B	Big Grassy First Nation	Anishinabeg of Kabapikotawangag Resource Council	Saulteaux		
Obadjiwan 15E	Batchewana First Nation	Association of Iroquois and Allied Indians	Ojibwe		
Ojibway Nation of Saugeen	Ojibway Nation of Saugeen		Ojibwe		Formerly Savant Lake
One Man Lake 29	Wabaseemoong Independent Nations	Bimose Tribal Council	Ojibwe		
Oneida 41	Oneida Nation of the Thames	Association of Iroquois and Allied Indians	Oneida		
Osnaburgh 63A	Mishkeegogamang First Nation	Nishnawbe Aski Nation Independent First Nations Alliance	Ojibwe Cree Oji-Cree		
Osnaburgh 63B	Mishkeegogamang First Nation	Independent First Nations Alliance Nishnawbe Aski Nation	Ojibwe Cree Oji-Cree		
Parry Island First Nation	Wasauksing First Nation	Waabnoong Bemjiwang Association of First Nations	Odawa, Ojibwe, Potawatomi	Depot Harbour	Formerly Parry Island First Nation 16
Pays Plat 51	Pays Plat First Nation	Union of Ontario Indians	Ojibwe		
Peawanuck	Weenusk First Nation	Mushkegowuk Council	Cree		Indian settlement
Pic Mobert North	Netmizaaggamig Nishnaabeg	Nokiiwin Tribal Council	Ojibwe		
Pic Mobert South	Netmizaaggamig Nishnaabeg	Nokiiwin Tribal Council	Ojibwe		
Pic River 50	Ojibways of the Pic River First Nation	Union of Ontario Indians	Ojibwe	Heron Bay	
Pikangikum 14	Pikangikum First Nation	Independent First Nations Alliance	Ojibwe		
Pikwàkanagàn	Algonquins of Pikwàkanagàn First Nation	Anishinabek Nation	Algonquin		Formerly Golden Lake 39
Point Grondine 3	Wiikwemkoong First Nation	Union of Ontario Indians	Odawa, Ojibwe, Potawatomi		
Poplar Hill	Poplar Hill First Nation	Keewaytinook Okimakanak Council	Anishinaabe		
Rainy Lake 17A	Naicatchewenin First Nation	Pwi-Di-Goo-Zing Ne-Yaa-Zhing Advisory Services	Anishinaabe		
Rainy Lake 17B	Naicatchewenin First Nation	Pwi-Di-Goo-Zing Ne-Yaa-Zhing Advisory Services	Anishinaabe		
Rainy Lake 18C	Mitaanjigamiing First Nation	Pwi-Di-Goo-Zing Ne-Yaa-Zhing Advisory Services	Ojibwe		
Rainy Lake 26A	Nigigoonsiminikaaning First Nation	Pwi-Di-Goo-Zing Ne-Yaa-Zhing Advisory Services	Saulteaux		
Rainy Lake 26B	Nigigoonsiminikaaning First Nation	Pwi-Di-Goo-Zing Ne-Yaa-Zhing Advisory Services	Saulteaux		
Rainy Lake 26C	Nigigoonsiminikaaning First Nation	Pwi-Di-Goo-Zing Ne-Yaa-Zhing Advisory Services	Saulteaux		
Rankin Location 15D	Batchewana First Nation	Association of Iroquois and Allied Indians	Ojibwe		
Rat Portage 38A	Obashkaandagaang Bay First Nation	Bimose Tribal Council	Ojibwe		
Red Rock 53	Red Rock Indian Band		Ojibwe		Formerly Parmachene 53
Rocky Bay 1	Biinjitiwaabik Zaaging Anishinaabek First Nation	Nokiiwin Tribal Council	Anishinaabe		
Sabaskong Bay 32C	Naotkamegwanning First Nation	Bimose Tribal Council	Saulteaux		
Sabaskong Bay 35C	Ojibways of Onigaming First Nation	Anishinabeg of Kabapikotawangag Resource Council	Saulteaux		
Sabaskong Bay 35D	Ojibways of Onigaming First Nation	Anishinabeg of Kabapikotawangag Resource Council	Saulteaux		
Sabaskong Bay 35F	Ojibways of Onigaming First Nation	Anishinabeg of Kabapikotawangag Resource Council	Saulteaux		
Sabaskong Bay 35H	Ojibways of Onigaming First Nation	Anishinabeg of Kabapikotawangag Resource Council	Saulteaux		
Sachigo Lake 1	Sachigo Lake First Nation	Windigo First Nations Council	Oji-Cree		
Sachigo Lake 2	Sachigo Lake First Nation	Windigo First Nations Council	Oji-Cree		
Sachigo Lake 3	Sachigo Lake First Nation	Windigo First Nations Council	Oji-Cree		
Sagamok	Sagamok Anishnawbek First Nation	Union of Ontario Indians	Odawa, Ojibwe, Potawatomi		
Sand Point First Nation	Bingwi Neyaashi Anishinaabek First Nation	Nokiiwin Tribal Council	Ojibwe		
Sandy Lake 88	Sandy Lake First Nation	Nishnawbe Aski Nation	Oji-Cree		
Sarnia 45	Aamjiwnaang First Nation	Union of Ontario Indians	Ojibwe		
Saug-a-Gaw-Sing 1	Anishnaabeg of Naongashiing	Anishinabeg of Kabapikotawangag Resource Council	Anishinaabe		
Saugeen 29	Saugeen First Nation		Ojibwe		Unceded territory
Saugeen and Cape Croker Fishing Islands 1	Chippewas of Nawash Unceded First Nation, Saugeen First Nation		Ojibwe		Unceded territory; shared by the two successor First Nations of the Chippewas of Saugeen Ojibway Territory
Saugeen Hunting Grounds 60A	Saugeen First Nation		Ojibwe		Unceded territory
Seine River 23A	Seine River First Nation	Pwi-Di-Goo-Zing Ne-Yaa-Zhing Advisory Services	Ojibwe		
Seine River 23B	Seine River First Nation	Pwi-Di-Goo-Zing Ne-Yaa-Zhing Advisory Services	Ojibwe		
Serpent River 7	Serpent River First Nation	Union of Ontario Indians	Anishinaabe		
Shawanaga 17	Shawanaga First Nation		Anishinaabe		
Shawanaga 17B	Shawanaga First Nation		Anishinaabe		
Sheguiandah 24	Sheguiandah First Nation	United Chiefs and Councils of Manitoulin	Anishinaabe		
Sheshegwaning 20	Sheshegwaning First Nation	United Chiefs and Councils of Manitoulin	Anishinaabe		
Shoal Lake 31J	Anishnaabeg of Naongashiing	Anishinabeg of Kabapikotawangag Resource Council	Anishinaabe		
Shoal Lake 34B1	Animakee Wa Zhing 37 First Nation	Anishinabeg of Kabapikotawangag Resource Council	Anishinaabe		
Shoal Lake 34B2	Iskatewizaagegan 39 Independent First Nation, Shoal Lake 40 First Nation	Bimose Tribal Council	Saulteaux		Shared between two First Nations
Shoal Lake 37A (part)	Animakee Wa Zhing 37 First Nation	Anishinabeg of Kabapikotawangag Resource Council	Anishinaabe		
Shoal Lake 39 (part)	Iskatewizaagegan 39 Independent First Nation	Bimose Tribal Council	Saulteaux		
Shoal Lake 39A (part)	Iskatewizaagegan 39 Independent First Nation	Bimose Tribal Council	Saulteaux		
Shoal Lake 40 (part)	Shoal Lake 40 First Nation	Bimose Tribal Council	Saulteaux		
Six Nations 40	Bearfoot Onondaga First Nation, Delaware First Nation, Konadaha Seneca First Nation, Lower Cayuga First Nation, Lower Mohawk First Nation, Mohawks of the Bay of Quinte First Nation, Niharondasa Seneca First Nation, Oneida First Nation, Onondaga Clear Sky First Nation, Tuscarora First Nation, Upper Cayuga First Nation, Upper Mohawk First Nation, Walker Mohawk First Nation		Cayuga, Lenape, Mohawk, Oneida, Onondaga, Seneca, Tuscarora	Ohsweken	Shared between 13 First Nations
Slate Falls	Slate Falls First Nation	Windigo First Nations Council	Ojibwe		Indian settlement
Sturgeon Falls 23	Seine River First Nation	Pwi-Di-Goo-Zing Ne-Yaa-Zhing Advisory Services	Ojibwe		
Sucker Creek 23	Aundeck Omni Kaning First Nation	United Chiefs and Councils of Manitoulin	Ojibwe		
Sugar Island 37A	Alderville First Nation	Ogemawahj Tribal Council	Mississauga		
Summer Beaver	Neskantaga First Nation, Nibinamik First Nation	Matawa First Nations	Oji-Cree		Indian settlement; shared between two First Nations
Swan Lake 29	Wabaseemoong Independent Nations	Bimose Tribal Council	Ojibwe		
Thessalon 12	Thessalon First Nation	Union of Ontario Indians	Ojibwe		
Tyendinaga Mohawk Territory	Mohawks of the Bay of Quinte First Nation	Association of Iroquois and Allied Indians	Mohawk		
Wabaseemoong	Wabaseemoong Independent Nations	Bimose Tribal Council	Ojibwe		Formerly Islington 29
Wabauskang 21	Wabauskang First Nation	Bimose Tribal Council	Saulteaux		
Wabigoon Lake 27	Wabigoon Lake Ojibway Nation	Bimose Tribal Council	Saulteaux		
Wahnapitae 11	Wahnapitae First Nation	Waabnoong Bemjiwang Association of First Nations	Ojibwe		
Wahta Mohawk Territory	Wahta Mohawks	Association of Iroquois and Allied Indians	Mohawk		
Walpole Island 46	Walpole Island First Nation		Odawa, Ojibwe, Potawatomi		Unceded territory
Wapekeka 1	Wapekeka First Nation	Shibogama First Nations Council	Oji-Cree		
Wapekeka 2	Wapekeka First Nation	Shibogama First Nations Council	Oji-Cree		
Wawakapewin	Wawakapewin First Nation	Shibogama First Nations Council	Oji-Cree		Formerly Long Dog Lake
Weagamow Lake 87	North Caribou Lake First Nation	Windigo First Nations Council	Oji-Cree	Weagamow Lake	
Webequie	Webequie First Nation	Matawa First Nations	Ojibwe		
Whitefish Bay 32A	Naotkamegwanning First Nation	Bimose Tribal Council	Saulteaux		
Whitefish Bay 33A	Northwest Angle 33 First Nation	Anishinabeg of Kabapikotawangag Resource Council	Saulteaux	Dog Paw	
Whitefish Bay 34A	Animakee Wa Zhing 37 First Nation	Anishinabeg of Kabapikotawangag Resource Council	Anishinaabe		
Whitefish Island	Batchewana First Nation	Association of Iroquois and Allied Indians	Ojibwe		
Whitefish Lake 6	Atikameksheng Anishnawbek First Nation	Union of Ontario Indians	Ojibwe		
Whitefish River 4	Whitefish River First Nation	United Chiefs and Councils of Manitoulin	Ojibwe		
Whitesand	Whitesand First Nation	Independent First Nations Alliance	Ojibwe		
Wiikwemkoong	Wiikwemkoong First Nation		Odawa, Ojibwe, Potawatomi	Buzwah, Kaboni, Murray Hill, South Bay, Two O'Clock, Wabozominissing, Wikwemikong, Wikwemikonsing	Unceded territory; formerly Wikwemikong Unceded 26
Winisk 90	Weenusk First Nation	Mushkegowuk Council	Cree		
Wunnumin 1	Wunnumin Lake First Nation	Shibogama First Nations Council	Oji-Cree		
Wunnumin 2	Wunnumin Lake First Nation	Shibogama First Nations Council	Oji-Cree		
Yellow Girl Bay 32B	Naotkamegwanning First Nation	Bimose Tribal Council	Saulteaux		
Zhiibaahaasing 19	Zhiibaahaasing First Nation	United Chiefs and Councils of Manitoulin	Odawa, Ojibwe		Former reserve
Zhiibaahaasing 19A	Zhiibaahaasing First Nation	United Chiefs and Councils of Manitoulin	Odawa, Ojibwe		Formerly Cockburn Island 19A

== Prince Edward Island ==
Name as used by Indigenous and Northern Affairs Canada	First Nation(s)	Ethnic/national group	Tribal council	Treaty	Area		Population			Notes
Name as used by Indigenous and Northern Affairs Canada	First Nation(s)	Ethnic/national group	Tribal council	Treaty	ha	acre	2016	2011	% difference	Notes
Lennox Island 1	Lennox Island	Miꞌkmaq	Epekwitk Assembly of Councils	n/a	535.1	1,322.3	323	293	10%	
Lennox Island No.6	Lennox Island	Miꞌkmaq	Epekwitk Assembly of Councils	n/a	9.7	24.0				
Lennox Island Reserve No. 5	Lennox Island	Miꞌkmaq	Epekwitk Assembly of Councils	n/a	18.8	46.5				
Morell 2	Abegweit	Miꞌkmaq	Epekwitk Assembly of Councils	n/a	74.1	183.1	22	24	-8.3%	
Rocky Point 3	Abegweit	Miꞌkmaq	Epekwitk Assembly of Councils	n/a	4.9	12.1	51	49	4.1%	
Scotchfort 4	Abegweit	Miꞌkmaq	Epekwitk Assembly of Councils	n/a	113.1	279.5	200	148	35.1%	

== Quebec ==
Name as used by Indigenous and Northern Affairs Canada	First Nation(s)	Ethnic/national group	Tribal council	Treaty	Area		Population			Notes & references
Name as used by Indigenous and Northern Affairs Canada	First Nation(s)	Ethnic/national group	Tribal council	Treaty	ha	acre	2016	2011	% difference	Notes & references
Akwesasne 15	Mohawks of Akwesasne	Mohawk		n/a	3,646.8	9,011.4	1,202			Also in Ontario (Akwesasne 59) and New York, United States (St. Regis Mohawk Reservation)
Betsiamites	Pessamit Innu Band	Innu	Mamuitun Tribal Council	n/a	25,205.0	62,282.9	2,256	2,420	-6.8%	
Cacouna 22	Première Nation Wolastoqiyik (Malécite) Wahsipekuk	Maliseet		n/a	0.9	2.2				
Communauté Atikamekw De Manawan	Atikamekw of Manawan	Atikamekw	Conseil de la Nation Atikamekw	n/a	773.0	1,910.1	2,060	2,073	-0.6%	
Communauté De Wemotaci	Wemotaci Atikamekw Council	Atikamekw	Conseil de la Nation Atikamekw	n/a	3,331.0	8,231.1	1,213	1,194	1.6%	
Coucoucache 24A	Wemotaci Atikamekw Council	Atikamekw	Conseil de la Nation Atikamekw	n/a	5.6	13.8				
Doncaster 17	Mohawks of Kahnawá:ke / Mohawks of Kanesatake	Mohawk		n/a	7,900.0	19,521.3				
Gesgapegiag	Micmacs of Gesgapegiag	Miꞌkmaq	Mi'gmawei Mawiomi Secretariat	n/a	222.0	548.6	653	688	-5.1%	
Innue Essipit	Innue Essipit	Innu	Mamuitun Tribal Council	n/a	86.5	213.7	297	268	10.8%	
Kahnawake No.14	Mohawks of Kahnawá:ke	Mohawk		n/a	4,902.0	12,113.1				
Kataskomiq	Première Nation Wolastoqiyik (Malécite) Wahsipekuk	Maliseet		n/a	169.0	417.6				
Kebaowek	Kebaowek First Nation	Anishinaabe	Algonquin Anishinabeg Nation Tribal Council	n/a	50.6	125.0	274	284	-3.5%	
Kitigan Zibi	Kitigan Zibi Anishinabeg	Algonquin	Algonquin Anishinabeg Nation Tribal Council	n/a	21,009.0	51,914.4	1,221	1,401	-12.8%	
Lac John	Innu Nation of Matimekush-Lac John	Innu	Mamuitun Tribal Council	n/a	23.5	58.1	33	21	57.1%	
Lac Simon	Nation Anishnabe du Lac Simon	Anishinaabe	Algonquin Anishinabeg Nation Tribal Council	n/a	678.4	1,676.4	1,380	1,403	-1.6%	
Listuguj	Listuguj Miꞌgmaq First Nation	Miꞌkmaq	Mi'gmawei Mawiomi Secretariat	n/a	4,344.0	10,734.3	1,241	1,865	-33.5%	
Maliotenam 27A	Innu Takuaikan Uashat Mak Mani-Utenam	Innu	Mamuitun Tribal Council	n/a	527.0	1,302.2	1,542	1,316	17.2%	
Mashteuiatsh	Pekuakamiulnuatsh First Nation	Innu	Mamuitun Tribal Council	n/a	1,626.9	4,020.2	1,957	2,213	-11.6%	
Matimekosh 3	Innu Nation of Matimekush-Lac John	Innu	Mamuitun Tribal Council	n/a	65.4	161.6	613	540	13.5%	
Mingan	Innus of Ekuanitshit	Innu	Regroupement Mamit Innuat	n/a	3,838.0	9,483.9	552	453	21.9%	
Nutashkuan	Première Nation des Innus de Nutashkuan	Innu	Regroupement Mamit Innuat	n/a	118.9	293.8	835	841	-0.7%	
Obedjiwan 28	Atikamekw of Opitciwan	Atikamekw	Conseil de la Nation Atikamekw	n/a	927.0	2,290.7	2,019	2,031	-0.6%	
Odanak 12	Odanak First Nation	Abenaki	Grand Conseil de la Nation Waban-Aki	n/a	578.0	1,428.3	449	457	-1.8%	
Pikogan	Abitibiwinni First Nation	Algonquin	Algonquin Anishinabeg Nation Tribal Council	n/a	274.6	678.6	538	538	0.0%	
Rapid Lake	Algonquins of Barriere Lake	Algonquin	Algonquin Nation Programs and Services Secretariat	n/a	29.7	73.4				
Romaine 2	Montagnais de Unamen Shipu	Innu	Regroupement Mamit Innuat	n/a	69.4	171.5	977	1,016	-3.8%	
Timiskaming	Timiskaming First Nation	Algonquin	Algonquin Nation Programs and Services Secretariat	n/a	1,852.0	4,576.4	539	540	-0.2%	
Uashat 27	Innu Takuaikan Uashat Mak Mani-Utenam	Innu	Mamuitun Tribal Council	n/a	210.0	518.9	1,592	1,485	7.2%	
Village Des Hurons Wendake 7	Huron-Wendat Nation	Wyandot		n/a	133.4	329.6	2,134			
Village Des Hurons Wendake 7A	Huron-Wendat Nation	Wyandot		n/a	244.6	604.4				
Wôlinak 11	Wôlinak First Nation	Abenaki	Grand Conseil de la Nation Waban-Aki	n/a	80.4	198.7	202	180	12.2%	

=== Notes ===
Other First Nations lands can be found at list of Cree and Naskapi territories in Quebec and Inuit lands at list of northern villages and Inuit reserved lands in Quebec.

In Quebec, the Indian Act applies only to the First Nations of the southern part of the province, so Indian reserves are only found in the south. The Minister of Crown–Indigenous Relations assigns 34 tracts of land as Indian reserves and settlements under the Indian Act:

== Saskatchewan ==
Indian reserve	Government/band	Tribal council	Ethnic/national group	Communities	Comments
Ahtahkakoop 104	Ahtahkakoop First Nation	Battlefords Agency Tribal Chiefs	Cree	Shell Lake	
Amisk Lake 184	Peter Ballantyne Cree Nation	PADC Management Company Ltd	Cree		
Amiskosakahikan 210	Peter Ballantyne Cree Nation	PADC Management Company Ltd	Cree		
Asimakaniseekan Askiy 102A	Muskeg Lake First Nation 102	Saskatoon Tribal Council	Cree		
Asimakaniseekan Askiy No. 102B	Muskeg Lake First Nation 102	Saskatoon Tribal Council	Cree		
Assiniboine 76	Carry the Kettle First Nation		Nakoda		
Beardy's 97		Independent	Cree	Duck Lake	
Big Head 124			Cree		
Big River 118	Big River First Nation	Agency Chiefs Tribal Council	Cree		
Buffalo River Dene Nation 193		Meadow Lake Tribal Council	Dene	Dillon	
Canoe Lake 165		Meadow Lake Tribal Council	Cree		
Carrot River 29A	Red Earth First Nation		Cree		
Chicken 224, 225			Dene	Black Lake	
Chitek Lake 191	Pelican Lake First Nation			Cree	
Clearwater River Dene Nation 221, 222, 223		Meadow Lake Tribal Council	Dene	Clearwater River	
Coté 64	Coté First Nation	Yorkton Tribal Council	Saulteaux		
Cowessess 73		Independent	Cree		
Cumberland 20		Prince Albert Grand Council	Cree		
Day Star 87		Touchwood Agency Tribal Council	Cree	Punnichy	
Fishing Lake 89	Fishing Lake First Nation	Touchwood Agency Tribal Council	Saulteaux		
Flying Dust First Nation Reserve 105	Flying Dust First Nation	Meadow Lake Tribal Council	Cree	Meadow Lake	
Fond du Lac 227		Prince Albert Grand Council	Dene	Fond-du-Lac	
Gordon 86	Gordon First Nation	Treaty 4	Cree	Punnichy, Saskatchewan	
Grizzly Bear's Head 110	Mosquito-Grizzly Bear's Head-Lean Man		Assiniboine		
James Smith 100		Prince Albert Grand Council	Cree		
Kahkewistahaw 72		Yorkton Tribal Council	Cree		
Keeseekoose 66	Keeseekoose First Nation		Chippewa		
Keeseekoose 66A	Keeseekoose First Nation		Chippewa		
Keeseekoose 66-CA-04	Keeseekoose First Nation		Chippewa		
Keeseekoose 66-CA-05	Keeseekoose First Nation		Chippewa		
Keeseekoose 66-CA-06	Keeseekoose First Nation		Chippewa		
Keeseekoose 66-KE-04	Keeseekoose First Nation		Chippewa		
Keeseekoose 66-KE-05	Keeseekoose First Nation		Chippewa		
Kinistin 91		Saskatoon Tribal Council	Saulteaux		
Lac la Hache 220		Prince Albert Grand Council	Dene	Wollaston Lake	
Lean Man 111	Mosquito-Grizzly Bear's Head-Lean Man		Assiniboine		
Little Black Bear 84		File Hills Qu'Appelle Tribal Council	Cree		
Little Bone 74B			Cree		
Little Pine Indian Reserve 116		Battlefords Tribal Council	Cree		
Little Red River 106D			Cree		
Makaoo 120	Onion Lake First Nation		Cree		
Makwa Lake 129	Makwa Sahgaiehcan First Nation		Cree		
Makwa Lake 129A	Makwa Sahgaiehcan First Nation		Cree		
Makwa Lake 129B	Makwa Sahgaiehcan First Nation		Cree		
Makwa Lake 129C	Makwa Sahgaiehcan First Nation		Cree		
Meadow Lake 105			Cree		
Meadow Lake 105A			Cree		
Min-A-He-Quo-Sis 116C			Cree		
Ministikwan 161			Cree		
Ministikwan 161A			Cree		
Mistawasis 103		Saskatoon Tribal Council	Cree		
Montreal Lake 106		Prince Albert Grand Council	Cree		
Moosomin 112B		Battlefords Agency Tribal Chiefs	Cree		
Mosquito 109	Mosquito-Grizzly Bear's Head-Lean Man		Assiniboine		
Mosquito-Grizzly Bear's Head-Lean Man			Assiniboine		
Muscowpetung 80		File Hills Qu'Appelle Tribal Council	Saulteaux		
Muskeg Lake 102B	Muskeg Lake First Nation	Saskatoon Tribal Council	Cree		
Muskeg Lake 102D	Muskeg Lake First Nation	Saskatoon Tribal Council	Cree		
Muskeg Lake 102E			Cree		
Muskeg Lake 102F			Cree		
Muskeg Lake 102G	Muskeg Lake First Nation		Cree		
Muskeg Lake 102	Muskeg Lake First Nation		Cree		
Muskoday First Nation		Saskatoon Tribal Council	Cree, Saulteaux		
Muskowekwan 85	Muskowekwan First Nation	Touchwood Agency Tribal Council	Saulteaux		
Muskowekwan 85-1	Muskowekwan First Nation	Touchwood Agency Tribal Council	Saulteaux		
Muskowekwan 85-10	Muskowekwan First Nation	Touchwood Agency Tribal Council	Saulteaux		
Muskowekwan 85-12	Muskowekwan First Nation	Touchwood Agency Tribal Council	Saulteaux		
Muskowekwan 85-15	Muskowekwan First Nation	Touchwood Agency Tribal Council	Saulteaux		
Muskowekwan 85-17	Muskowekwan First Nation	Touchwood Agency Tribal Council	Saulteaux		
Muskowekwan 85-22	Muskowekwan First Nation	Touchwood Agency Tribal Council	Saulteaux		
Muskowekwan 85-23	Muskowekwan First Nation	Touchwood Agency Tribal Council	Saulteaux		
Muskowekwan 85-24	Muskowekwan First Nation	Touchwood Agency Tribal Council	Saulteaux		
Muskowekwan 85-26	Muskowekwan First Nation	Touchwood Agency Tribal Council	Saulteaux		
Muskowekwan 85-27	Muskowekwan First Nation	Touchwood Agency Tribal Council	Saulteaux		
Muskowekwan 85-28	Muskowekwan First Nation	Touchwood Agency Tribal Council	Saulteaux		
Muskowekwan 85-29	Muskowekwan First Nation	Touchwood Agency Tribal Council	Saulteaux		
Muskowekwan 85-2A	Muskowekwan First Nation	Touchwood Agency Tribal Council	Saulteaux		
Muskowekwan 85-31	Muskowekwan First Nation	Touchwood Agency Tribal Council	Saulteaux		
Muskowekwan 85-33	Muskowekwan First Nation	Touchwood Agency Tribal Council	Saulteaux		
Muskowekwan 85-8	Muskowekwan First Nation	Touchwood Agency Tribal Council	Saulteaux		
Nekaneet First Nation		File Hills Qu'Appelle Tribal Council	Cree		
Ocean Man 69	Ocean Man First Nation		Assiniboine, Saulteaux, Cree		
Ocean Man 69A	Ocean Man First Nation		Assiniboine, Saulteaux, Cree		
Ocean Man 69B	Ocean Man First Nation		Assiniboine, Saulteaux, Cree		
Ocean Man 69C	Ocean Man First Nation		Assiniboine, Saulteaux, Cree		
Ocean Man 69E	Ocean Man First Nation		Assiniboine, Saulteaux, Cree		
Ocean Man 69F	Ocean Man First Nation		Assiniboine, Saulteaux, Cree		
Ochapowace 71			Cree		
Ochapowace 71-10			Cree		
Ochapowace 71-18			Cree		
Ochapowace 71-26			Cree		
Ochapowace 71-44			Cree		
Ochapowace 71-51			Cree		
Ochapowace 71-54			Cree		
Ochapowace 71-7			Cree		
Ochapowace 71-70			Cree		
Okanese 82	Okanese First Nation	File Hills Qu'Appelle Tribal Council	Cree, Saulteaux		
Okemasis 96			Cree		
One Arrow Indian Reserve 95	One Arrow First Nation	Saskatoon Tribal Council	Cree		
Pasqua 79	Pasqua First Nation	File Hills Qu'Appelle Tribal Council	Cree, Saulteaux		
Patuanak			Dene		
Peepeekisis 81	Peepeekisis First Nation	File Hills Qu'Appelle Tribal Council	Cree		
Pelican Lake 191A	Pelican Lake First Nation	Agency Chiefs Tribal Council	Cree		
Pelican Lake 191B	Pelican Lake First Nation	Agency Chiefs Tribal Council	Cree		
Pelican Narrows 184b	Pelican Narrows First Nation		Cree		
Pheasant Rump 68	Pheasant Rump Nakota First Nation	Yorkton Tribal Council	Assiniboine, Saulteaux, Cree		
Piapot 75	Piapot First Nation	File Hills Qu'Appelle Tribal Council	Cree		
Piapot First Nation 75H	Piapot First Nation	File Hills Qu'Appelle Tribal Council	Cree		
Poor Man 88	Poor Man First Nation	Touchwood Agency Tribal Council	Cree	Punnichy, Saskatchewan	
Poundmaker 114		Battlefords Tribal Council	Cree		
Red Earth 29	Red Earth First Nation	Prince Albert Grand Council	Cree		
Red Pheasant 108	Red Pheasant First Nation	Battlefords Agency Tribal Chiefs	Cree		
Sakimay 74	Sakimay First Nation	Yorkton Tribal Council	Cree		
Saulteaux 159	Saulteaux First Nation	Battlefords Agency Tribal Chiefs	Anishnaabe		
Saulteaux 159A	Saulteaux First Nation	Battlefords Agency Tribal Chiefs	Anishnaabe		
Seekaskootch 119	Onion Lake First Nation		Cree		
Shesheep 74A	Shesheep First Nation		Cree		
Shoal Lake 28a	Shoal Lake First Nation	Prince Albert Grand Council	Cree		
Standing Buffalo 78	Standing Buffalo First Nation	File Hills Qu'Appelle Tribal Council	Dakota Sioux		
Stanley 157			Cree		
Star Blanket 83	Star Blanket First Nation	File Hills Qu'Appelle Tribal Council	Cree		
Star Blanket 83C	Star Blanket First Nation	File Hills Qu'Appelle Tribal Council	Cree		
Sturgeon Lake 101	Sturgeon Lake First Nation	Prince Albert Grand Council	Cree		
Sweetgrass 113	Sweetgrass First Nation	Battlefords Agency Tribal Chiefs	Cree		
Sweetgrass 113-L6	Sweetgrass First Nation	Battlefords Agency Tribal Chiefs	Cree		
Sweet Grass 113-M16	Sweetgrass First Nation	Battlefords Agency Tribal Chiefs	Cree		
The Key 65		Yorkton Tribal Council	Saulteaux		
Thunderchild First Nation 115B	Thunderchild First Nation		Cree		
Thunderchild First Nation 115C	Thunderchild First Nation		Cree		
Thunderchild First Nation 115D	Thunderchild First Nation		Cree		
Treaty Four Reserve Grounds 77					
Turnor Lake 193b	Turnor Lake First Nation		Dene		
Wahpaton 94a		Prince Albert Grand Council	Dakota Sioux		
Wapachewunak 192d	English River First Nation		Dene		
Waterhen Lake 130	Waterhen Lake First Nation	Meadow Lake Tribal Council	Cree		
White Bear 70		Southeast Treaty#4 Tribal Council	Saulteaux, Cree, Nakoda, Dakota		
Whitecap 94	Whitecap Dakota First Nation	Saskatoon Tribal Council	Dakota Sioux		
Witchekan Lake 117	Witchekan Lake First Nation	Agency Chiefs Tribal Council	Cree		
Witchekan Lake 117-D	Witchekan Lake First Nation	Agency Chiefs Tribal Council	Cree		
Wood Mountain 160		File Hills Qu'Appelle Tribal Council	Lakota		
Yellow Quill 90		Saskatoon Tribal Council	Saulteaux		

== See also ==
- List of Indian reserves in Canada by population
- List of place names in Canada of Aboriginal origin
- List of First Nations governments
- List of First Nations peoples
- Classification of the Indigenous peoples of the Americas
