= Kenjgewin Teg =

Canadian Post-Secondary Indigenous Institute

Coordinates: 45°48′42″N 82°09′28″W

- Motto: Inspired learning!
- Type: Indigenous-owned and controlled post-secondary institution.
- Established: 1994
- Affiliations: United Chiefs and Councils of Manitoulin, Indian & Northern Affairs Canada, and the Ontario Ministry of Education
- President: Beverley Roy
- Undergraduates: university, and continuing education students
- Location: 374A Highway 551, M'Chigeeng First Nation, Mnidoo Mnis Manitoulin Island, Ontario, Canada P0P 1G0
- Campus: M'Chigeeng and Sudbury
- Mascots: Living, learning, inviting opportunities
- Website: Official website

Kenjgewin Teg (formerly Kenjgewin Teg Educational Institute) is an Indigenous-owned and controlled post-secondary institution at M'Chigeeng First Nation, on Mnidoo Mnising Manitoulin Island, Ontario, Canada. In the Ojibwe language, Kenjgewin Teg means a place of knowledge.

Programs are offered to its eight-member First Nations:

- Aundeck Omni Kaning First Nation
- Constance Lake First Nation
- M'Chigeeng First Nation
- Sagamok First Nation
- Sheguiandah First Nation
- Sheshegwaning First Nation
- Whitefish River First Nation
- Zhiibaahaasing First Nation

== History ==
In April 1994, the Wautebek Training Institute and Nda-Gkenjge-Gamig Educational Institute merged to create the Kenjgewin Teg Educational Institute (KTEI). Kenjgewin Teg developed Joint Management Committees with the affiliated educational institutions.

In January 2022, Kenjgewin Teg received accreditation from the Indigenous Advanced Education and Skills Council to offer certificates, diplomas and degrees.

== Partnerships ==
=== University ===
- Indigenous Teacher Education Program, Queens' University
- Master of Education in World Indigenous Studies in Education (WISE), Queens' University
- Master of Social Work, Indigenous Field of Study, Laurentian University

=== College ===
- Practical Nursing, Fleming College
- Personal Support Worker, Canadore College
- Anishinaabemowin Early Childhood Education, Canadore College
- Renovation Techniques: Construction Carpentry, Canadore College

== See also ==
- United Chiefs and Councils of Manitoulin
