= Union of Nova Scotia Mi'kmaq =

Tribal Council in Nova Scotia, Canada

The Union of Nova Scotia Mi'kmaq is a tribal council in Nova Scotia, Canada. It was created in 1969, and known as the Union of Nova Scotia Indians until being renamed in 2019. Since Acadia First Nation left to join the Confederacy of Mainland Mi'kmaq in 2019, the UNSM has five member communities: Eskasoni, Membertou, Potlotek, Wagmatcook, and We'koqma'q.

== See also ==
- Confederacy of Mainland Mi'kmaq - another Tribal Council in Nova Scotia
