= United Chiefs and Councils of Manitoulin =

The United Chiefs and Councils of Manitoulin (also known as the United Chiefs and Councils of Mnidoo Mnising) is a tribal council based on and around Manitoulin Island in Ontario, Canada.

Its affiliate members include:

- Aundeck Omni Kaning First Nation
- M'Chigeeng First Nation
- Sheguiandah First Nation
- Sheshegwaning First Nation
- Whitefish River First Nation
- Zhiibaahaasing First Nation

== See also ==
- Kenjgewin Teg Educational Institute
