= Paqꞌtnkek First Nation =

Mi'kmaq band in Nova Scotia

Coordinates: 45.6016°N 61.7383°W

Paqtnkek Mi’kmaw Nation Paqtnkek-Niktuek
- Mi'kmaq First Nation
- Interactive map of Paqtnkek Mi’kmaw Nation
- Country: Canada
- Province: Nova Scotia
- County: Antigonish County
- Recognized: 1820 (Pomquet and Afton 23)

Area
  - Total: 4.61 km^{2} (1.78 sq mi)

Population (December 2019)
  - Total: 598
- Time zone: AST
- Website: paqtnkek.ca
- Member of the Confederacy of Mainland Mi'kmaq

Paqtnkek Mi’kmaw Nation (pronounced buck-n-keg) is a Mi'kmaq Band in northeastern Nova Scotia. Its populated reserve is Paqtnkek-Niktuek 23. As of December 2019 the total registered population was 598. It is a member of the Confederacy of Mainland Mi'kmaq. The name Paqtnkek means “by the bay” or "Above the water (but at a distance from the ocean)". The area has long been important to Mi'kmaq for the fishing of eel and other species.

== Bayside Travel Centre ==
The lands of the First Nation were divided in 1960 with the building of the Trans-Canada Highway, making access to some parts difficult. In 2017 an agreement was reached with federal and provincial governments to build a new interchange, which opened in 2019. The band's business arm, Bayside Development Corporation Limited was incorporated in 2018 and its shares are held in trust for the benefit of Paqtnkek. It operates Bayside Travel Centre at exit 36-B on Nova Scotia Highway 104 which includes fuel service, convenience store, restaurants, a Nova Scotia Liquor Corporation agency store, entertainment centre and a visitor information centre with cultural displays. It opened in October 2019.

== Reserves ==
Paq'tnkek First Nation has three reserves:

| Reserve | Area | Location | Population | Date established |
|---|---|---|---|---|
| Franklin Manor 22 (48% share) | 212.5 hectares (525 acres) | 32 km. southeast of Amherst | 0 | March 3, 1865 |
| Pomquet and Afton 23 / Paqtnkek-Niktuek 23 | 204.8 hectares (506 acres) | 24 km. east of Antigonish | 353 | March 3, 1820 |
| Summerside / Welnek 38 | 43.4 hectares (107 acres) | 18 km. east of Antigonish | 0 | August 28, 1990 |

== See also ==
- List of Indian Reserves in Nova Scotia
- List of Indian Reserves in Canada
