= Chippewa Island =

- Indian reserve
- Chippewa Island Indian Reserve
- Location within Southern Ontario
- Coordinates: 45°05′N 80°02′W
- Country: Canada
- Province: Ontario
- District municipality: Muskoka
- First Nations: Beausoleil, Chippewas of Georgina Island, Chippewas of Rama

Area
  - Land: 0.03 km^{2} (0.012 sq mi)

Chippewa Island is a First Nations reserve consisting of two islands in Twelve Mile Bay of Georgian Bay. The islands are adjacent to the Moose Deer Point First Nation. The islands are shared between the Beausoleil First Nation, the Chippewas of Georgina Island First Nation and the Chippewas of Rama First Nation.
