= Confederacy of Mainland Mi'kmaq =

Tribal Council in Nova Scotia, Canada

The Confederacy of Mainland Mi'kmaq is a tribal council in Nova Scotia, Canada. It was incorporated in 1986 and has its main office at Millbrook First Nation. It delivers community programs and advisory services to its members. It has eight member communities: Annapolis Valley, Bear River, Glooscap, Millbrook, Paq'tnkek, Pictou Landing, Sipekne'katik, and Acadia, the last of which joined in 2019.

== See also ==
- Union of Nova Scotia Mi'kmaq - another tribal council in Nova Scotia
