= Ogemawahj Tribal Council =

Ogemawahj Tribal Council is a non-profit Regional Chiefs' Council representing Mississaugas, Ojibwa and Potawatomi First Nations in southern Ontario, Canada. The Council provides advisory services and program delivery to its six member-Nations.

== Mandate ==
According to their own website, the Ogemawahj Tribal Council state their mandate is "...to represent and conduct Tribal Council business in the approved name of the Ogemawahj Tribal Council ... To exercise this delegation with respect and proper duty ... And to comply fully with the wishes and expectations of those First Nations from which the OTC authority is derived."

== Council ==
The Council is made up of a representing Chief from each of the six member communities. The Chiefs provide political direction to the organization in its strategic planning, government relations and policy development. To assist in these activities, the Council maintains a political and advocacy staff to support its efforts in helping their communities to prosper.

== Services ==
- Economic Development
- Education
  - Capacity Building and Professional Development for Education Managers
  - Curriculum development
  - Education as a key component in Self-government
  - Education Services Contract development and negotiation
  - Information gathering and resource services
  - Post-secondary funding policy development
  - School Reviews of First Nation operated schools
  - Special Education advisory services
- Employment and Training
- Financial Management
- Technical Services
  - Community Asset Management Systems
  - Community Planning
  - Compliance Inspections on new or renovated homes
  - Capital Asset Management Systems (CAMS)
  - Environmental Assessments
  - Ontario Building Code Standards
  - Project Management
  - Residential Rehabilitation Assistance Program (RRAP)
  - Water & Waste water training
- Policy, Planning and Inter-governmental Relations

== Member First Nations ==
- Mississaugas of Alderville First Nation
- Chippewas of Beausoleil First Nation
- Chippewas of Georgina Island First Nation
- Chippewas of Rama First Nation
- Mississaugas of Scugog Island First Nation
- Pottawatomi of Moose Deer Point First Nation
