= Saskatoon Tribal Council =

Tribal council representing First Nations in Saskatchewan, Canada

- Abbreviation: STC
- Formation: 1982; 44 years ago
- Legal status: Tribal Council
- Headquarters: Saskatoon, Saskatchewan, Canada
- Members: 12,586 (2014)
- Tribal Chief: Mark Arcand (Muskeg Lake Cree Nation)
- Staff: 500 (Estimated)
- Website: sktc.sk.ca

The Saskatoon Tribal Council is a tribal council in the Treaty 6 Territory representing seven First Nation band governments in the province of Saskatchewan. Its head offices are located in the city of Saskatoon.

== Demographics ==
The seven First Nations of the Saskatoon Tribal Council have over 12,586 registered members.

== Members ==
- Kinistin Saulteaux Nation had 990 registered members as of October 2014.
- Mistawasis First Nation had 2,629 registered members as of October 2014.
- Muskeg Lake Cree Nation had 1,848 registered members.
- Muskoday First Nation had 1,829 registered members as of October 2014.
- One Arrow First Nation had 1,790 registered members as of October 2014.
- Whitecap Dakota First Nation had 628 registered members as of October 2014.
- Yellow Quill First Nation had 2,882 registered members as of October 2014.

== Services ==
The Saskatoon Tribal Council is composed of five corporations: STC Inc., STC Health & Family Services Inc., STC Urban Inc., Cress Housing Inc. and Dakota Dunes CDC Inc. The organization offers a broad range of services and supports to its members and the broader Saskatoon and area communities. The programs and services offered include community justice programs, affordable housing, environmental health, child and family services, health, inner-youth, public works, labor force, economic development, and education.
