= Anishinabe of Wauzhushk Onigum =

Anishinaabe First Nation in Ontario, Canada

Anishinabe of Wauzhushk Onigum (Ojibwe: Wazhashk-Onigam Anishinaabeg) is an Anishinaabe First Nation in northwestern Ontario. Its reserves include Kenora 38B and the shared reserve of Agency 30. It is a part of the Anishinabeg of Kabapikotawangag Resource Council, a party to the Grand Council of Treaty 3. Wauzhushk Onigum is governed by 1 Chief and 3 Council members. The current Chief is Chris Skead and council members are Marion Prince, Ed Skeid and Donald Biggeorge. Chief and council are elected by members of Wauzhushk Onigum.
