= Wagmatcook First Nation =

Mi'kmaq band in Cape Breton, Nova Scotia, Canada

Coordinates: 46.074°N 60.915°W

Wagmatcook First Nation (Mi'kmaq: Waqmɨtkuk) is a band of Mi'kmaq people in Cape Breton Island, Nova Scotia. As of 2016, the registered population is 537. It includes the Margaree 25 reserve.

== See also ==
- List of Indian Reserves in Nova Scotia
