= We'koqma'q First Nation =

First Nation in Nova Scotia, Canada

Coordinates: 45.972°N 61.141°W

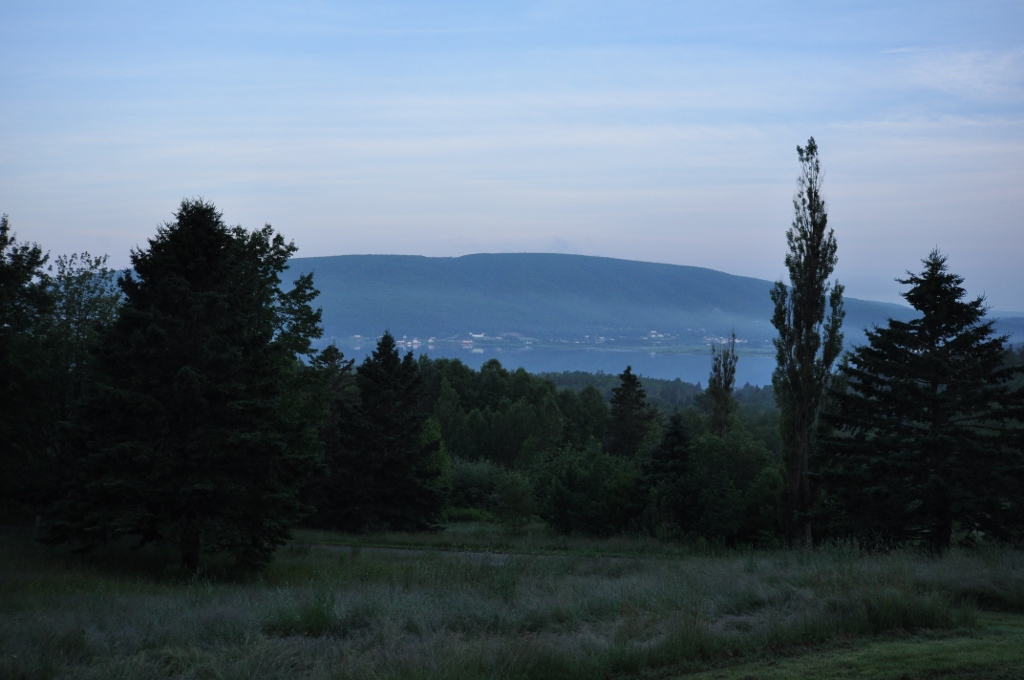
Whycocomagh 2 reserve

We'koqma'q First Nation (historically known as Waycobah First Nation) is composed of two Mi'kmaq Indigenous communities on Cape Breton Island, Nova Scotia. As of 2025, the population is 1,139. It is composed of two parts:

Community	Area	Location	Date established
Malagawatch 4 (1/5 share)	661.3 hectares (1,634 acres)	62 km. southwest of Sydney	August 2, 1833
Whycocomagh 2	828.5 hectares (2,047 acres)	70.4 km. west of Sydney	January 31, 1833

== See also ==
- List of Native Reserves in Nova Scotia
- List of Native Reserves in Canada

== Notable residents ==
- Rita Joe, poet
- Morgan Toney, singer/songwriter
- Loretta Gould, artist
- TODD., rapper
