= Anishinabeg of Kabapikotawangag Resource Council =

First Nations tribal council in Ontario and Manitoba, Canada

The Anishinabeg of Kabapikotawangag Resource Council is a First Nations tribal council in Ontario and Manitoba. It is part of the Grand Council of Treaty 3, and includes the Animakee Wa Zhing 37 First Nation, Big Grassy First Nation, the Northwest Angle 33 First Nation, the Ojibways of Onigaming First Nation and the Anishinabe of Wauzhushk Onigum.
