= Waabnoong Bemjiwang Association of First Nations =

Tribal council in Ontario, Canada

The Waabnoong Bemjiwang Association of First Nations is a tribal council of First Nations in the Georgian Bay region of Ontario, Canada. The council consists of the Dokis, Henvey Inlet, Magnetawan and Wasauksing First Nations in the Parry Sound District, the Wahnapitae First Nation near Sudbury and the Nipissing First Nation near Sturgeon Falls.
