= Prince Albert Grand Council =

Tribal council in Saskatchewan, Canada

- Abbreviation: PAGC
- Formation: 1977; 49 years ago
- Legal status: Tribal Council
- Headquarters: Prince Albert, Saskatchewan, Canada
- Members: 38,832 (2013)
- Grand Chief: Brian Hardlotte (Lac La Ronge Indian Band)
- Vice Chief: Joseph Tsannie (Hatchet Lake Denesuline First Nation), & Christopher Jobb (Peter Ballantyne Cree Nation)
- Website: https://www.pagc.sk.ca/
- Formerly called: Prince Albert District Chiefs (PADC), Prince Albert Tribal Council (PATC)

The Prince Albert Grand Council (PAGC) is a tribal council representing the band governments of twelve First Nations in the province of Saskatchewan. Its head offices are located in the city of Prince Albert. The tribal council was created in 1977 and is one of the largest in Canada.

== Demographics ==
As of March 2013 there were 38,832 registered members in the 12 First Nation bands.

== Members ==
- Wahpeton Dakota Nation with offices in Redwing. Registered members: 500
- Sturgeon Lake First Nation with offices in Shellbrook. Registered members: 2,756
- James Smith Cree Nation with offices in Melfort. Registered members: 3,239
- Montreal Lake Cree Nation with offices in Montreal Lake. Registered members: 3,678
- Lac La Ronge Indian Band with offices in La Ronge. Registered members: 9,765
- Peter Ballantyne Cree Nation with offices in Pelican Narrows. Registered members: 9,394
- Cumberland House Cree Nation with offices in Cumberland House. Registered members: 1,387
- Shoal Lake Cree Nation with offices in Pakwaw Lake. Registered members: 919
- Red Earth Cree Nation with offices in Prince Albert. Registered members: 1,602
- Hatchet Lake Dene Nation with offices in Wollaston Lake. Registered members: 1,685
- Black Lake Denesuline First Nation with offices in Black Lake. Registered members: 2,039
- Fond du Lac Dene Nation with offices in Fond du Lac. Registered members: 1,867
