= God's Lake First Nation =

God's Lake manto sakahigan ᒪᓂᑐ ᓵᑲᐦᐃᑲᐣ
- Indian reserve
- Location of God's Lake in Manitoba
- Coordinates: 54°34′14″N 94°27′53″W
- Country: Canada
- Province: Manitoba
- Region: Northern

Government
  - MP (Churchill—Keewatinook Aski): Niki Ashton (NDP)
  - MLA (Keewatinook): Ian Bushie (NDP)

Area
  - Total: 47.06 km^{2} (18.17 sq mi)
- Elevation: 178 m (584 ft)

Population (2016)
  - Total: 982
  - Density: 20.9/km^{2} (54/sq mi)
- Time zone: UTC-6 (CST)
  - Summer (DST): UTC-5 (CDT)

God's Lake First Nation (Cree: manto sakahigan, ᒪᓂᑐ ᓵᑲᐦᐃᑲᐣ) is a First Nations band government whose reserve is primarily located at an area known as God's Lake Narrows, about 250 kilometres southeast of Thompson, Manitoba. There are about 2,638 registered members of First Nation #296. They are Swampy Cree, and more specifically, Rocky Cree (Asinīskāwiyiniwak). The First Nation is a member of the Keewatin Tribal Council.

== Demographics ==
As of September 2014 the total registered population of God's Lake First Nation was 2,638 with 1,482 members living on reserve or Crown Land and 1,156 members living off reserve.

The 2011 Canada Census reported 1,341 inhabitants in the reserve known as God's Lake 23, the largest of 15 reserves of God's Lake First Nation.

== See also ==
- Gods Lake
- Gods Lake Narrows
