= Sabaskong Bay 35H =

- Indian reserve
- Sabaskong Bay Indian Reserve No. 35H
- Location within Ontario
- Coordinates: 49°11′N 94°12′W
- Country: Canada
- Province: Ontario
- District: Rainy River
- First Nation: Ojibways of Onigaming

Area
  - Land: 2.60 km^{2} (1.00 sq mi)

Sabaskong Bay 35H is a First Nations reserve on Lake of the Woods in Ontario, Canada. It is one of the reserves of the Ojibways of Onigaming First Nation.
