= Independent First Nations Alliance =

Independent First Nations Alliance (IFNA) is a non-profit Regional Chiefs' Council representing Ojibway and Oji-Cree First Nations in northern Ontario, Canada. The Council provides advisory services and program delivery to its five member-Nations.

== Council ==
Incorporated in 1989, IFNA is made up of a representing Chief from each of the five member communities; upon the guidance of the people, the IFNA Chiefs direct the affairs of the IFNA based on customary norms and traditional consensus building. The Chiefs provide political direction to the organization in its strategic planning, government relations and policy development while IFNA provides the technical advisory and community development support programs to meet the needs and aspirations of its First Nations on a collective basis while each member First Nation maintains its autonomy. To assist in these activities, IFNA maintains a political and advocacy staff to support its efforts in helping their communities to prosper. In turn, IFNA is a member of Nishnawbe Aski Nation, a Tribal Political Organization representing majority of Treaty 5 and Treaty 9 First Nations in northern Ontario. IFNA member First Nations represent Treaties 3, 5, and 9 and the Robinson-Superior Treaty.

== Member First Nations ==
- Kitchenuhmaykoosib Inninuwug First Nation
- Lac Seul First Nation
- Muskrat Dam First Nation
- Pikangikum First Nation
- Whitesand First Nation
