= Zhiibaahaasing First Nation =

Zhiibaahaasing 19A
- Indian reserve
- Zhiibaahaasing (Cockburn Island) Indian Reserve No. 19A
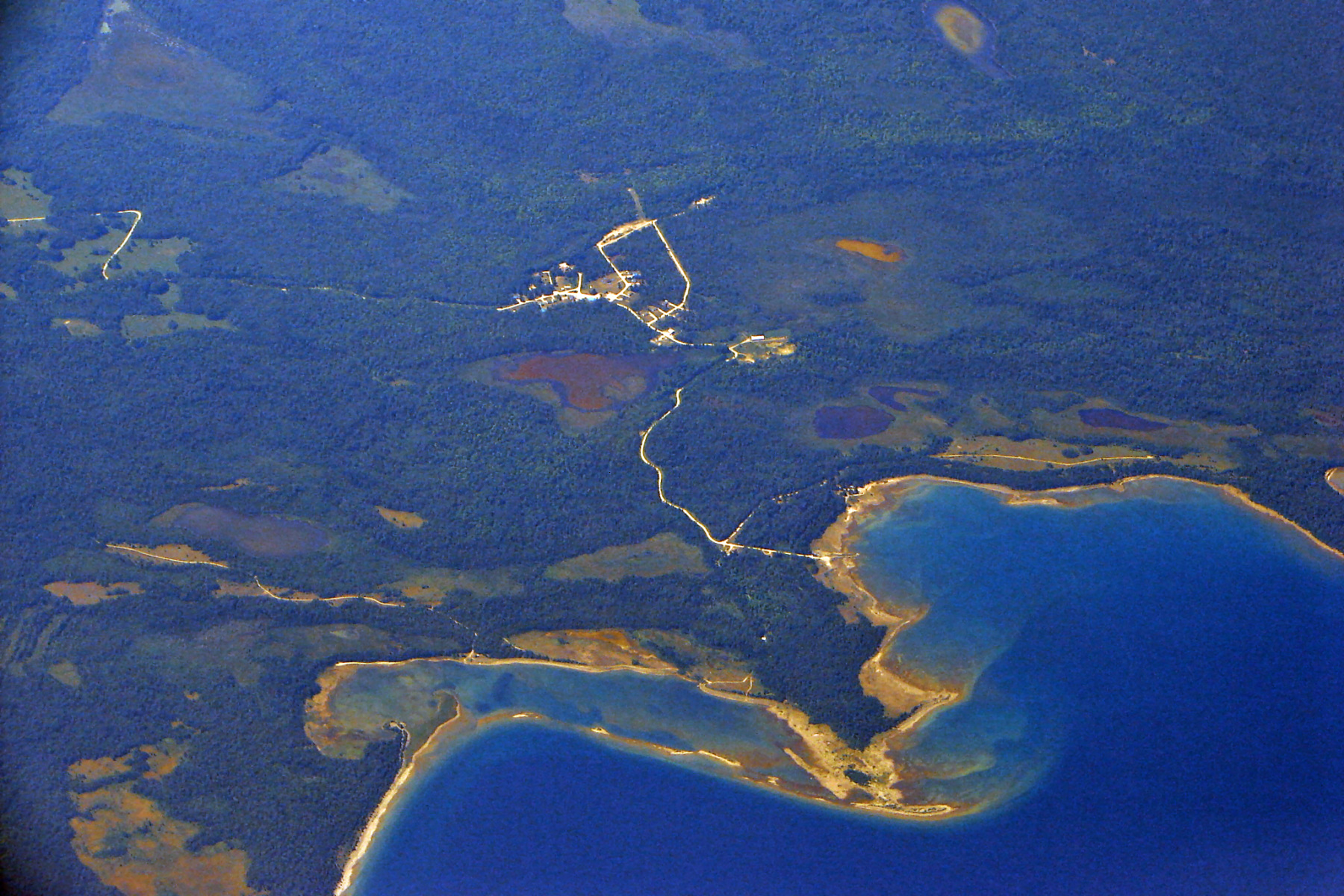

- Location of the Zhiibaahaasing First Nation on a map of Southern Ontario
- Coordinates: 45°56′38″N 82°52′41″W
- Country: Canada
- Province: Ontario
- District: Manitoulin
- First Nation: Zhiibaahaasing

Area
  - Land: 6.087 km^{2} (2.350 sq mi)

Population (2016)
  - Total: 55
  - Density: 9.3/km^{2} (24/sq mi)

Zhiibaahaasing First Nation (formerly Cockburn Island First Nation) is a First Nation band government in the Canadian province of Ontario. It is a member of the United Chiefs and Councils of Manitoulin.

An Odawa and Ojibwe community located in the Manitoulin District, the First Nation has two distinct parcels of land. The first, on Manitoulin Island and legally designated as Zhiibaahaasing 19A, had a population of 55 in the 2011 Canadian Census and 55 in the 2016 Canadian Census. The second, located on Cockburn Island and legally designated as Zhiibaahaasing 19, had no permanent population in the same census. For census purposes, Zhiibaahaasing 19 has been dissolved into the township municipality of Cockburn Island; however, the reserve land itself is still set aside for the Zhiibaahaasing First Nation. The two reserves have a total area of 958.3 hectares (2,368 acres); the Infobox for this article lists only the area for Zhiibaahaasing 19A, 608.70 hectares (1,504.1 acres).

There was a significant amount of controversy surrounding a stockpile of more than one million tires within the Zhiibaahaasing First Nation. Cockburn Island Tire Recycling planned to process the tires, but due to an equipment malfunction, tires were stockpiled while the facility was not operating. Many area residents were concerned about the health and environmental consequences should there be a tire fire. In September, 2006, Indian and Northern Affairs Canada agreed to provide funding for the removal of the tires.

== See also ==
- Kenjgewin Teg Educational Institute
- Mekayla Diehl
