= War Lake First Nation =

War Lake First Nation ᒨᓱᑯᐟ môsokot
- Headquarters: Ilford, Manitoba

Land
- Main reserve: Mooseocoot Indian Reserve

Government
- Chief: Betsy Kennedy
- Council: Dwayne Flett and Roy Ouskun

Tribal Council
- Keewatin Tribal Council

The War Lake First Nation (Cree: ᒨᓱᑯᐟ, môsokot) is a First Nations community located within the boundaries of Ilford, Manitoba. Its members are residents of the Mooseocoot Indian Reserve.
