= Yarmouth 33 =

Mi'kmaq reserve in Nova Scotia, Canada

Coordinates: 43°50′9.22″N 66°5′0.20″W

Yarmouth 33 in Nova Scotia

First established on June 8, 1887, Yarmouth 33 is a Mi'kmaq reserve located in Yarmouth County, Nova Scotia. As of 2021, the population was 181, a 15.3% increase from 2016.

It is administratively part of the Wasoqopa'q First Nation. Of the five Wasoqopa'q First Nation reserves, the Yarmouth Reserve has the largest population and maintains the highest Band membership. It is considered the central hub of the Wasoqopa'q First Nation, with the main office located there.
