= Shibogama First Nations Council =

Tribal council in Ontario, Canada

Shibogama First Nations Council (Oji-Cree: ᔑᑄᑲᒫ ᓂᐢᑕᒼ ᐊᓇᐦᔑᓈᐯᐠ ᐅᓇᐦᔕᐌᓂᓂᐗᐠ (Zhibwagamaa Nistam-Anashinaabeg Onashaweniniwag), unpointed: ᔑᐧᐸᑲᒪ ᓂᐢᑕᒼ ᐊᓇᔑᓇᐯᐠ ᐅᓇᔕᐧᐁᓂᓂᐧᐊᐠ), is a regional tribal council located in northwestern Ontario, Canada. Like many of the other regional councils, Shibogama is a member of the Nishnawbe Aski Nation. On September 28, 1984, the Shibogama Area Tribal Council was established at the Kasabonika Lake Band Office. In January 1985, Shibogama First Nations Council was incorporated, making it officially an organization that is controlled and governed by the Board of Directors who are the Chiefs from each of the six member First Nations.

== Departments ==
- Administration
- Shibogama Education (ᔑᐳᑲᒫ ᐃᐢᑰᓄᐱᒧᒋᑫᐏᐣ (Zhibogamaa Iskoono-bimojigewin); unpointed: ᔑᐳᑭᒥ ᐃᐢᑯᓄᐱᒧᒋᑫᐏᐣ)
- Technical Services - Provides community and public development support, such as construction management, CADD designs, water and sewer troubleshooting and compliance inspection. In addition, Technical Services also provide PC network setup and support.
- Health Authority

== Member First Nations ==
- Kasabonika First Nation
- Kingfisher First Nation
- Wapekeka First Nation
- Wawakapewin First Nation
- Wunnumin Lake First Nation
