= Nokiiwin Tribal Council =

Canadian First Nations chiefs' council

Coordinates: 48°19′54″N 89°12′37″W

Nokiiwin Tribal Council (from Ojibwe anokiiwin, "work, employment") is a non-profit Regional Chiefs' Council located in the Thunder Bay District, Ontario, Canada, serving five First Nations by providing advisory services and training which will enhance the overall management skills and opportunities of the area's First Nations.

== Governance ==
The Council was formed in 2008 to serve five Ojibwe First Nations in western Robinson-Superior Treaty area. Since its creation, one First Nation left the council but another First Nation joined the council, concentrating the membership to the Lake Nipigon area of Robinson-Superior Treaty area. In turn, majority of the Nokiiwin Tribal Council member First Nations are also members of Union of Ontario Indians, a Tribal Political Organization that represents many of the Anishinaabe First Nation governments in Ontario.

=== Current members ===
- Animbiigoo Zaagi'igan Anishinaabek (Lake Nipigon) First Nation^{†‡}
- Bingwi Neyaashi Anishinaabek (Sand Point) First Nation^{†}
- Biinjitwaabik Zaaging Anishinaabek (Rocky Bay) First Nation^{†}
- Fort William First Nation^{†}
- Kiaske Zaaging Anishinabek (Gull Bay) First Nation^{†}
- Netmizaaggamig Nishnaabeg (Pic Mobert)

^{†} Founding members
^{‡} not a member of Union of Ontario Indians
