= Bingwi Neyaashi Anishinaabek =

Bingwi Neyaashi Anishinaabek Band No. 196
- People: Ojibwe
- Province: Ontario

Land
- Main reserve: Sand Point First Nation Reserve

Population (2022)
- On reserve: 12
- On other land: 18
- Off reserve: 346
- Total population: 358

Government
- Chief: Paul Gladu
- Council: Lillian Calder; Tracy Gibson

Tribal Council
- Nokiiwin Tribal Council

Website
- bnafn.ca

Bingwi Neyaashi Anishinaabek (formerly known as Sand Point First Nation, and occasionally known as Bingwi Neyaashi Anishinaabeg) is an Ojibwe First Nation Band government in Northwestern Ontario, Canada.

Their traditional territory is the Sand Point, located on the south east shores of Lake Nipigon, in Greenstone near Fairloch, formerly occupied by the Lake Nipigon Provincial Park. In October 2008, they had a total registered population of 185 people, of which only four people lived on Sand Point. In 2014, the total registered population was 251 members.

The Nation is led by Chief Paul Gladu. The council is a member of Nokiiwin Tribal Council, a Regional Chiefs' Council, and is member of Independent First Nations. The First Nation is also a member of Waaskiinaysay Ziibi Inc., an economic development corporation made up of five Lake Nipigon First Nations.

== Notable members ==
- Norval Morrisseau (1932–2007), artist and founder of the Woodlands style of painting
