= File Hills Qu'Appelle Tribal Council =

Tribal council in Saskatchewan, Canada

- Abbreviation: FHQTC
- Formation: 1970
- Headquarters: Fort Qu'Appelle
- Location: Canada
- Region served: Northwestern Saskatchewan
- Tribal Chief: Jeremy Fourhorns
- Website: https://fhqtc.com/
- Formerly called: Touchwood File Hills Qu’Appelle (TFHQ)

The File Hills Qu'Appelle Tribal Council (FHQTC) is a tribal council representing eleven First Nation governments under the File Hills Agency and the Qu’Appelle Agency in the province of Saskatchewan. The council is based in Meadow Lake, Saskatchewan.

== Members ==
- File Hills Agency
  - Carry the Kettle Nakoda Nation
  - Little Black Bear First Nation
  - Okanese First Nation
  - Peepeekisis Cree Nation
  - Star Blanket Cree Nation
- Qu’Appelle Agency
  - Muscowpetung Saulteaux Nation
  - Nekaneet First Nation
  - Pasqua First Nation
  - Piapot First Nation
  - Standing Buffalo Dakota Nation
  - Wood Mountain Lakota First Nation
