= Association of Iroquois and Allied Indians =

The Association of Iroquois and Allied Indians (AIAI) is a political territorial organization (PTO) mandated to defend and enhance the Indigenous and Treaty rights of its 7-member First Nations in Ontario, Canada.

A non-profit organization, AIAI was founded in 1969 in response to an era of government practices attempting to culturally and socially assimilate First Nations. AIAI provides political representation and policy analysis on behalf of these 7 nations in areas that include health, social development, education, intergovernmental affairs, and treaty rights. The group has twice made representations to the United Nations on living conditions and land claims.

== Membership ==
AIAI is unique among provincial associations because of the diversity of its members. AIAI represent Oneida, Mohawk, Delaware, Potawatomi, and Ojibway communities from all across Ontario. While these communities may have different languages, cultural practices and a widespread geography, they are united through AIAI to collectively protect their Indigenous and Treaty rights.

The combined population of the member bands is 20,000. These bands are the:

- Batchewana First Nation, near Sault Ste. Marie
- Caldwell First Nation, near Leamington
- Hiawatha First Nation near Peterborough
- Mohawks of the Bay of Quinte, near Belleville
- Moravian of the Thames (Delaware Nation), near Chatham
- Oneida Nation of the Thames, near London
- Wahta Mohawks near Parry Sound

== Political Leadership ==
AIAI is governed by a Chiefs Council, composed of elected Chiefs from each member Nation. Chiefs Council is led by a Grand Chief and Deputy Grand Chief and meets on a quarterly basis.

Members of Chiefs Council

- Grand Chief Gord Peters
- Deputy Grand Chief Denise Stonefish
- Chief Dean Sayers, Batchewana
- Chief Louise Hillier, Caldwell
- Chief Greg Peters, Delaware
- Chief Laurie Carr, Hiawatha
- Chief R. Donald Maracle, Mohawks of the Bay of Quinte
- Chief Sheri Doxtator, Oneida
- Chief Philip Franks, Wahta
