= Wasoqopa'q First Nation =

First Nation in Nova Scotia

The Wasoqopa'q First Nation, also known as Acadia First Nation, is composed of five Mi'kmaq First Nation reserves located in southwestern Nova Scotia. As of 2015, the Mi'kmaq population is 223 on-reserve, and 1,288 off-reserve. Acadia First Nation was founded in 1967 and covers the south shore area of Nova Scotia and Yarmouth County. The community runs multiple businesses including five gaming centres, three gas stations and two Rose Purdy centers.

== Composition ==
Wasoqopa'q First Nation is composed of five parts as shown:

Community	Area	Location	Population	Date established
Gold River 21	270.2 hectares (668 acres)	60.8 km. west of Halifax	77	May 8, 1820
Medway River 11	4.7 hectares (12 acres)	108.8 km. southwest of Halifax	0	May 8, 1865
Ponhook Lake 10	101.8 hectares (252 acres)	115.2 km. southwest of Halifax	15	June 8, 1843
Wildcat 12	465.4 hectares (1,150 acres)	111 km. southwest of Halifax	33	June 8, 1820
Yarmouth 33	27.7 hectares (68 acres)	3.2 km. east of Yarmouth	157	June 8, 1887

== See also ==
- List of Indian Reserves in Nova Scotia
- List of Indian Reserves in Canada
