= Aundeck Omni Kaning First Nation =

Sucker Creek 23
- Indian reserve
- Sucker Creek Indian Reserve No. 23
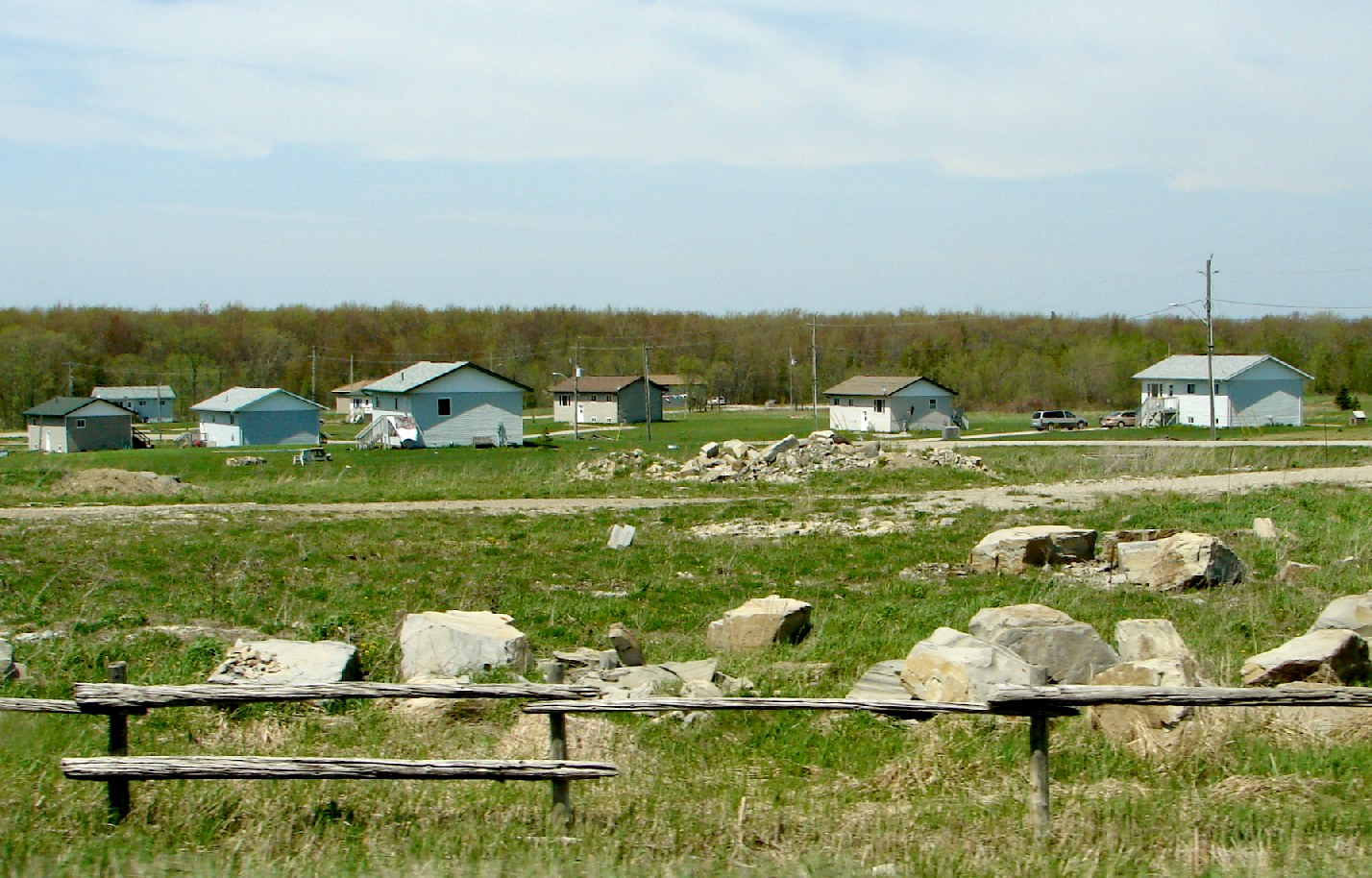

- Location within Southern Ontario
- Coordinates: 45°58′N 82°00′W
- Country: Canada
- Province: Ontario
- District: Manitoulin
- First Nation: Aundeck Omni Kaning

Area
  - Land: 6.49 km^{2} (2.51 sq mi)

Population (2011)
  - Total: 365
  - Density: 56.2/km^{2} (146/sq mi)
- Time zone: UTC-5 (EST)
  - Summer (DST): UTC-4 (EDT)
- Website: aundeckomnikaningfn.com

Aundeck Omni Kaning First Nation is an Ojibway First Nation on Manitoulin Island, with their reserve at Sucker Creek 23. The First Nation is a member of the United Chiefs and Councils of Manitoulin and the Anishinabek Nation. They were formerly known as the Ojibways of Sucker Creek. It took less than 50 people to change the name and the original logo to what it is today.

In 1895 the name of reserve was originally spelled as: Aundagwahmenekauning.

George Abotossaway is regarded as a founding forefather of Aundeck Omni Kaning formerly Sucker Creek First Nation.

Documentation shows that by 1952, he and his family helped establish the settlement of Wabejiwong (now Little Current), which played a key role in area development.

== Community Relocation Begins (circa 1874–1880) ==
Although appraisal occurred in 1855, records show no families living on the Sucker Creek reserve until 1874. The actual relocation of Ojibwe families did not occur until around 1880, when the government began moving residents out of Little Current/Wabejiwong and into the newly‑designated reserve.

The original people of Sucker Creek First Nation are Anishinaabe/Ojibwe families whose roots on Manitoulin Island extend far into pre‑contact history. The community was formally established in the late 1800s with foundational families such as Abotossaway, Columbus, Esquimaux, Zack, Muckdabin, and Shokan, later joined by other Ojibwe families including Madahbee and Corbiere. Their Anishinaabe name, Aundeck Omni Kaning, reflects their true identity and cultural heritage.

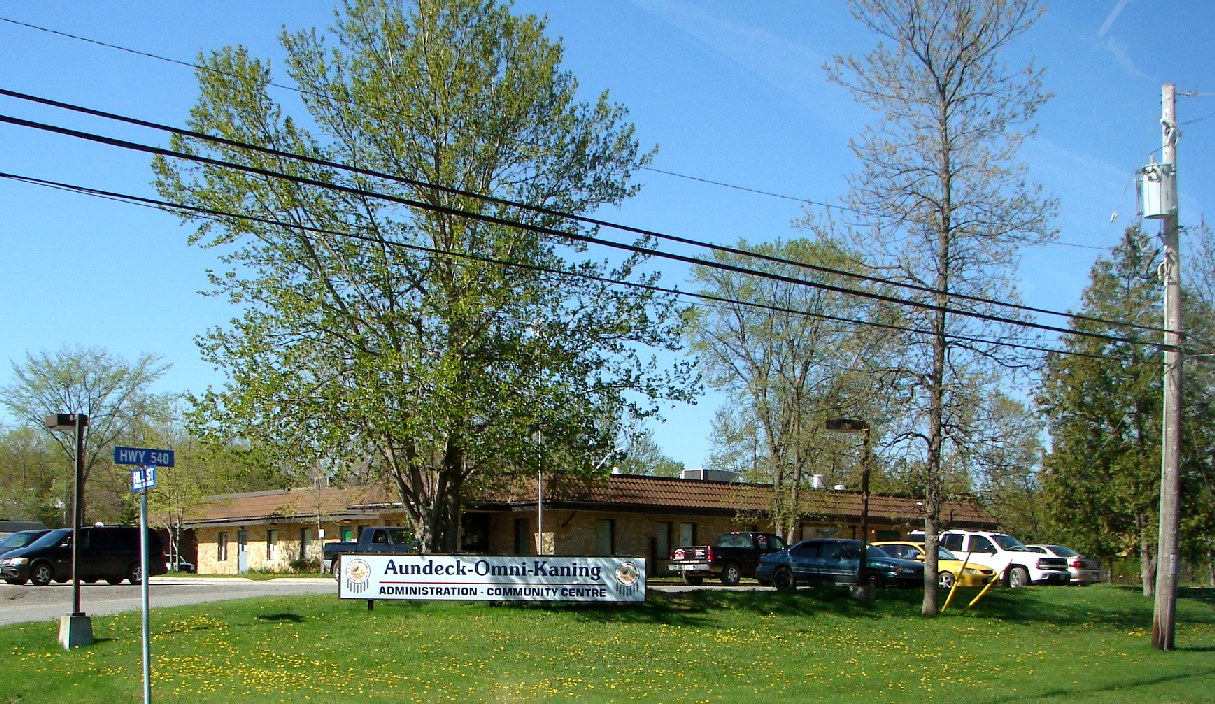
Administration and Community Centre
