= Moose Deer Point First Nation =

Moose Point 79
- Indian reserve
- Moose Point Indian Reserve No. 79
- Location within Southern Ontario
- Coordinates: 44°42′N 79°18′W
- Country: Canada
- Province: Ontario
- District Municipality: Muskoka
- First Nation: Moose Deer Point

Area
  - Land: 2.67 km^{2} (1.03 sq mi)

Population (2011)
  - Total: 210
  - Density: 78.7/km^{2} (204/sq mi)
- Website: moosedeerpoint.ca

Moose Deer Point First Nation is a Potawatomi First Nation in the District Municipality of Muskoka, Ontario. It has a reserve called Moose Point 79. The reserve is located along Twelve Mile Bay.

The First nation is a member of the Anishinabek Nation organization.

Members of Moose Deer Point are descended from settlers from the American Midwest who arrived in Southern Ontario (Beausoleil Island on Georgian Bay) in the 1830s and later arrived in the area. The reserve was surveyed in 1917.

== Government ==
The reserve is led by band council consisting of a Chief and four councillors. The council is supported by an administrator, finance officer and clerical staff.

=== Services ===
Basic services offered to reserve residents include:

- Children Services
- Elders Services
- Health Services
- Education
- Social Services
- Recreation
- Economic Development
- Water Services
- Fire Services – one station with man by volunteers in Gordons Bay; supported by two fire trucks
- Maintenance

More advanced medical services are available from Georgian Bay General Hospital in Penetanguishene, Ontario or Huntsville District Memorial Hospital in Huntsville, Ontario.

== Transportation ==
Twelve Mile Bay Road is the main road in the reserve and makes connections to Ontario Highway 400.

Local roads on reserve:

- Williams Wharf Road
- Ogemawahj Road
- Mitawbik Road
- Moose Deer Point Marina Road
- Bloody Bay Road
- Harrison Trail
- Lagoon Road

Water access to the area are made by boats from Moose Deer Point Marina.

== Communities ==
- King Bay – residential area located near Big David Bay
- Isaac Bay – residential area along Twelve Mile Bay
- Gordons Bay – main hub with commercial, recreational and administration services along Twelve Mile Bay

== Nearby ==
- O'Donnell Point Provincial Nature Reserve – a non-operating provincial park (closed to public use)
