= Sheguiandah First Nation =

Sheguiandah 24
- Indian reserve
- Sheguiandah Indian Reserve No. 24
- Location within Southern Ontario
- Coordinates: 45°52′N 81°56′W
- Country: Canada
- Province: Ontario
- District: Manitoulin
- First Nation: Sheguiandah

Area
  - Land: 20.64 km^{2} (7.97 sq mi)

Population (2011)
  - Total: 154
  - Density: 7.5/km^{2} (19/sq mi)

Sheguiandah First Nation is an Anishinaabe First Nation on Manitoulin Island in Ontario, Canada. Its land base is located on the Sheguiandah 24 reserve.
