= Sheshegwaning First Nation =

Sheshegwaning 20
- Indian reserve
- Sheshegwaning Indian Reserve No. 20
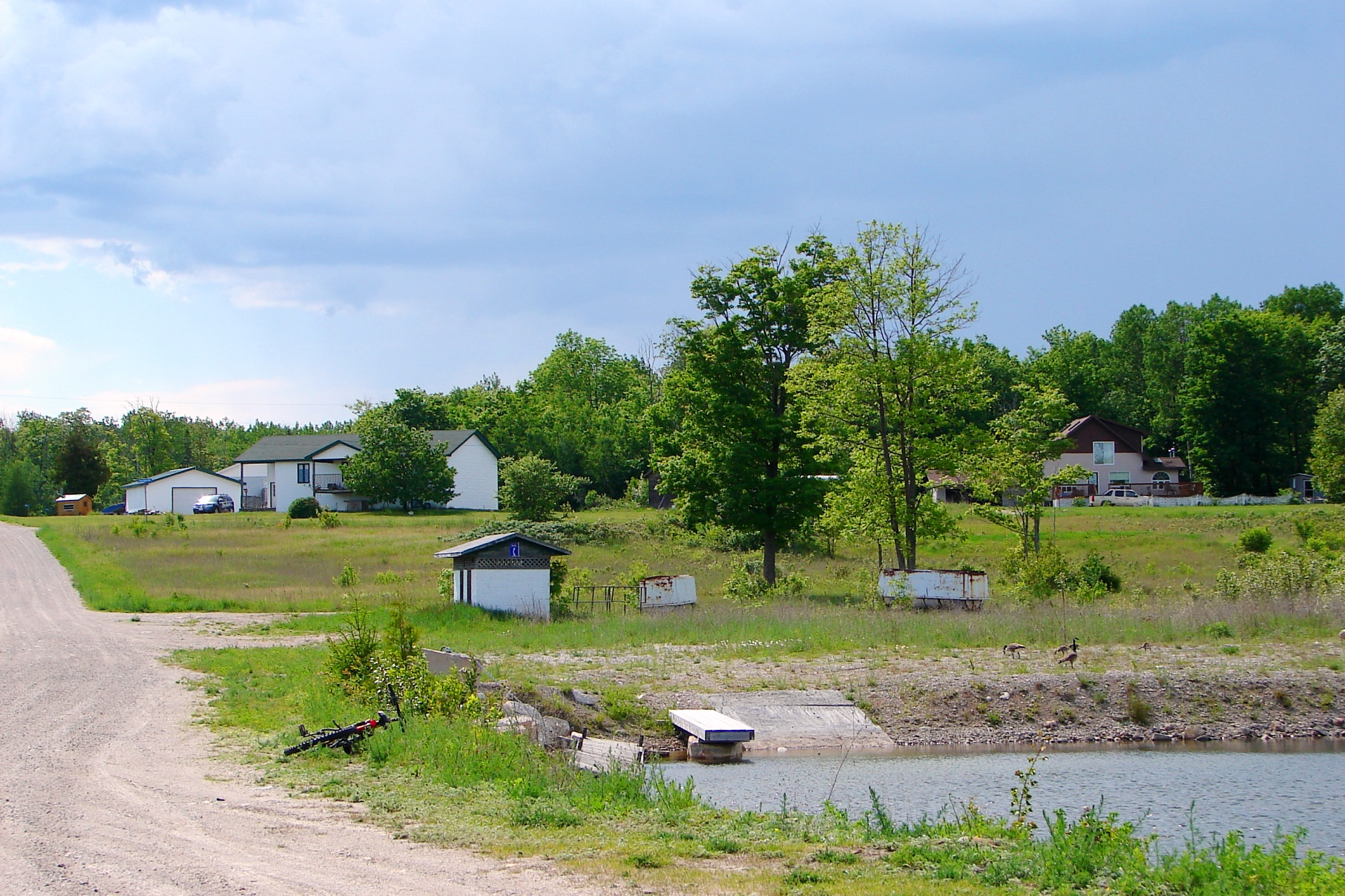

- Location within Manitoulin District Location within Ontario
- Coordinates: 45°56′N 82°51′W
- Country: Canada
- Province: Ontario
- District: Manitoulin
- First Nation: Sheshegwaning

Area
  - Land: 20.28 km^{2} (7.83 sq mi)

Population (2011)
  - Total: 118
  - Density: 5.8/km^{2} (15/sq mi)
- Website: www.sheshegwaning.org/default.asp

Sheshegwaning First Nation is an Odawa First Nation on Manitoulin Island in Ontario, Canada. Its land base is located on the Sheshegwaning 20 reserve.

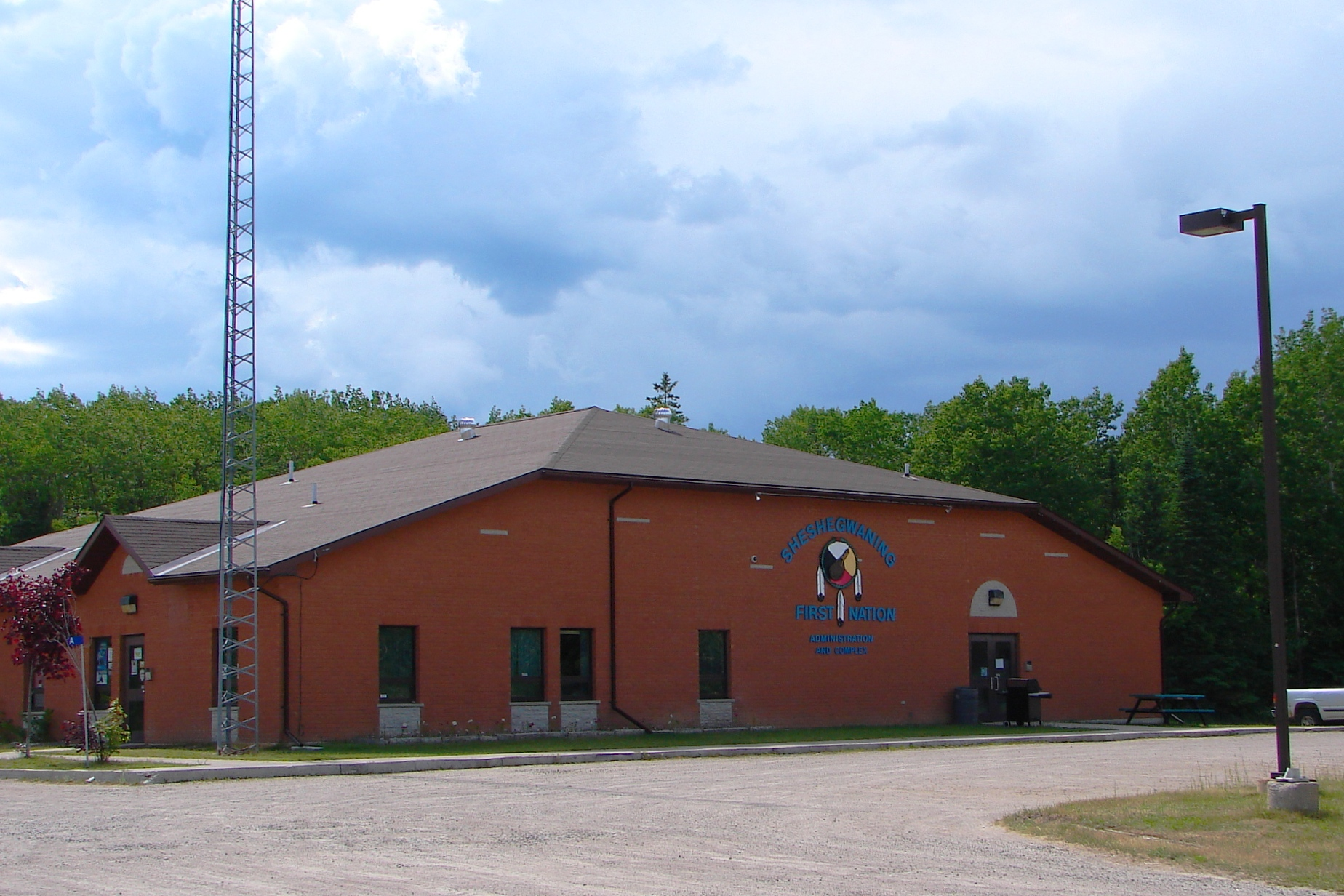
Sheshegwaning administration building
