= Treaty Three Police Service =

- Motto: Serving the People and Communities of the Treaty # 3 Area

Agency overview
- Formed: 2003

Jurisdictional structure
- Legal jurisdiction: Aboriginal/Regional

Operational structure
- Sworn members: 85
- Elected officer responsible: The Honourable Sylvia Jones, Minister of Community Safety and Correctional Services
- Agency executive: Kai Liu, Chief of Police

Facilities
- Stations: 2 Sub Divisions several satellite detachments

Website
- Official website

The Treaty Three Police Service (T3PS) is a self-administered First Nation Police service in Ontario, serving all Treaty 3 First Nations.

It began as the Treaty #3 Policing Initiative in August 1999 as directed by the Executive Council of Grand Council of Treaty 3. It officially began operation on August 5, 2003, and became Canada's newest self-administered First Nation police service.

Members of Treaty Three Police are appointed as First Nations Constables by the Commissioner of the OPP pursuant to s.54 of the Police Services Act. They have the powers of a police officer for the purpose of carrying out duties specified in their appointments and under federal law have the powers and protections of peace officers. Because First Nations Constables are not police officers as defined by the Police Services Act, their status in law is different but equal to that of a police officer.

The jurisdiction of the Treaty Three Police Service includes all signatory Treaty 3 First Nations (The Paypom Treaty) previously policed by the OPP administered First Nations Policing Program. The OPP are mandated to provide policing on a reserve, village or any other area not currently under a policing agreement. All operations save major crimes are investigated by Treaty Three First Nations Constable patrol officers and/or the T3PS Crime Unit. The Service exists with the unanimous agreement of the signatory Band Councils or Band Chiefs. Unlike police forces in cities and towns, the Treaty Three Police Service is not required to provide all the regular services of a police force but does provide virtually everything needed (or requests additional OPP resources, e.g. K9 Unit).

Nationally, standards for First Nations Constable recruitment and attendance at formal police colleges, varies from province to province, however since inception all Treaty Three Officers meet all applicable Ontario provincial training standards and attend the same courses as Ontario police officers.

== Inception ==
Formally incorporated on April 1, 2003, the Treaty Three Police Service assumed all on-reserve policing duties in the area of Treaty 3 from the Ontario Provincial Police (OPP). Currently serving officers were recertified and signed on and the initial group of 12 newly hired recruits attended the Ontario Police College in Aylmer, Ontario in spring of 2003.

== Mission statement and motto ==
The T3PS's Police Services Board established its Mission Statement, which explicitly set out in the Articles of Incorporation as:

- to provide an effective, efficient and culturally sensitive police service to the member First Nations through the further development and expansion of the Treaty Three Police Service;
- to set out the roles, responsibilities and relationships among the member First Nations for the provision and maintenance of policing arrangements;
- to provide police services as may be necessary or appropriate to promote harmonious, healthy communities by keeping the peace and protecting persons and property through crime prevention, community education and law enforcement.

T3PS's motto is "policing for the people by the people".

== Staff ==
The City of Kenora hosts the T3PS's Headquarters on Round Lake, where Chief of Police Louie Napish took over for interim Chief Dan Davidson and his immediate predecessor, Conrad DeLaronde. From there the command staff oversees daily operations. Brian Rupert was the inaugural Chief until his retirement in October 2008. Until his recent retirement, Deputy Chief Ernest Jones is his counterpart in Couchiching First Nation until his retirement in the summer of 2006. Deputy Chief Larry Indian replaced Jones after three years, evacuating the unsafe and underfunded Couchiching OPP First Nations Program Detachment. He then commanded the Couchiching Sub Division from OPP Emo Detachment, Emo, Ontario until the move to a new facility on Agency One land near Couchiching. The sub-division became the more appropriately named South sub-division.

In Kenora, Deputy Chief Wally MacLeod initially oversaw the Kenora Sub Division until his retirement in 2006. Deputy Chief Louie Napish served as second in command of T3PS until he retired. Long time OPP liaison Terry Armstrong assumed that position after many years seconded from the OPP. Assisting them were two Staff Sergeants, Jim Harty, Kenora detachment commander, and Richard Darling, head of administration. Treaty Three has its own Crime Unit also based in Kenora led by OPP Detective Sergeant Rob Bears for several years until Doug McKenzie was eventually seconded in 2011. Terry Armstrong was interim Crime Manager until his promotion to Deputy Chief. Like other police services, the Detective branch runs parallel to the front line officers. After McKenzie returned to the OPP the crime unit was greatly reduced and supervised by Detective Sergeant Terry McCaffrey. After several resignations and reassignment HQ is now run by Chief Napish, Deputy Chief Jeff Skye, and Staff Sergeant Terry McCaffrey. Staff Sergeant Keith Singleton currently commands Kenora Detachment, while Staff Sergeant Richard Darling is serving as South Sub Division Detachment Commander.

Each Sub-division (one for each district, the physical building is sometimes referred to as "detachment", a holdover term from the OPP program) employs a number of Sergeants who answer to the sub-division commander in the day-to-day operations. Front line policing is performed by officers with the rank of Constable. After graduating from Ontario Police College and a probationary period, each recruit is granted the rank of Fourth Class constable, promoted based on experience and performance, and reaching the rank of First Class constable within three years.

Treaty Three Officers are sworn peace officers in the province of Ontario and the service currently has 85 sworn members, with more being hired as resources permit. Some of those officers have come from the OPP and its First Nations Program (the precursor to T3PS), Lac Seul Police, Royal Canadian Mounted Police (RCMP), and Nishnawbe-Aski Police Service. The vast majority of the members grew up in the area, with some coming as far as Winnipeg and Southern Ontario.

== Transportation ==
Currently T3PS uses the Chevrolet Impala SS, Chevrolet Tahoe, and recently the Chevrolet Sierra after the OPP Ford Crown Victoria, Ford Expedition and Ford Excursion were phased out. Also in service are boats and Polaris UTVs, allowing for a variety of deployment methods.

== Technology ==
T3PS also uses the same personal equipment, radio and computer systems and training system (such as the annual "block training" in CPR/First Aid, recent case law, investigative techniques and Use of Force" ) as the OPP, since the majority of the equipment and operations used by the First nations program is still used by the current service, allowing ease of use, and greater cooperation between neighbouring forces until T3PS can provide its own in-service training units and new police facilities.

Continuing upgrades to the OPP radio equipment were also adopted by Treaty Three Police. Treaty Three as of 2008 became part of the Wide Area Network. An officer from Kenora can quickly communicate with virtually anyone in the province via the Provincial Communications Center in Thunder Bay and/or the other three Provincial Communications Centers in London, Orillia, and North Bay.

== Equipment and Uniforms ==
The original OPP administered uniforms and shoulder flashes specific to individual reserves were retired and replaced with a navy blue uniform slightly lighter than the OPP uniforms. The T3PS symbol, created by a local resident, was adopted as the new shoulder flash. Black armour vests and ball caps with the T3PS symbol replaced the OPP stetson and blue armour, and the duty belt and equipment pouches were replaced with a basket weave design. The original white cruisers were replaced with brown Impalas and Tahoes. The original units have since been upgraded to a fleet of over 20 Chevrolet Impalas, Chevrolet Tahoes and Toyota RAV4s. All have been painted black with gold decals. As a cost savings measure T3PS began purchasing GMC Sierra's when the Tahoe's "miled out".

Introduced in 2003 in time for the graduation of the first 14 officers hired and subsequent ceremony in Kenora was the dress uniform. All black with gold along the tunic closure and along the pants seam, the uniform differs from other traditional dress uniforms by dropping the tie for a military style mandarin collar, vaguely reminiscent of the uniforms worn by First Nations Chiefs in the time of the Treaty 3 Signing.

== Geography ==
Treaty Three Police services 18,550 First Nations residents in 28 First Nation Territories in the Kenora and Rainy River districts. Due to the vast patrol area, (55,000 square miles) T3PS was divided into two major "sub-divisions" with smaller satellite detachments left over from the OPP administered program. The Kenora Sub-division was headquartered on Niisaachewan Anishinaabe Nation. Kenora Sub Division is now run out of the new Headquarters on Round Lake. Territories in the Rainy River district operated out of the Emo OPP detachment east of Manitou Rapids First Nations while Couchiching sub-division was relocated between fall of 2007 and spring 2011 from Couchiching First Nation near Fort Frances, Ontario while the new building was approved and constructed. Having been placed on "Agency One" land given to several local territories jointly, the detachment was renamed Treaty Three South Sub-Division

== Detachments ==
The Treaty Three Police Service General Headquarters and the Kenora Sub-Division are housed in the same building in Kenora. The Couchiching Sub–division was housed at the Emo OPP Detachment until the new South Sub-Division was opened in March 2011 on Couchiching First Nations.

Kenora Sub-division

- Kenora Patrol Zone
  - Obashkaandagaang Bay First Nation
  - Shoal Lake 40 First Nation
  - Anishinabe of Wauzhushk Onigum
  - Niisaachewan Anishinaabe Nation
  - Iskatewizaagegan 39 Independent First Nation
  - Northwest Angle 37 First Nation
- Grassy Narrows Patrol Zone
  - Grassy Narrows First Nation
- Wabaseemoong Patrol Zone
  - Wabaseemoong Independent Nations
- Kenora South Patrol Zone
  - Naotkamegwanning First Nation
  - Ojibways of Onigaming First Nation
  - Northwest Angle 33 First Nation
- Kenora East Patrol Zone
  - Eagle Lake First Nation
  - Wabigoon Lake First Nation
  - Wabauskang First Nation

South Sub-division/Couchiching Detachment (Fort Frances area)

- Fort Frances Patrol Zone
  - Nigigoonsiminikaaning First Nation
- Lac La Croix Patrol Zone
  - Lac La Croix First Nation
- Big Island/Big Grassy Patrol Zone
  - Big Grassy First Nation
  - Anishnaabeg of Naongashiing

== 2013 Budget Issues ==
Starting in March 2013, Treaty Three Police was forced into a position of laying off officers due to a chronic shortage of funding. According to the local Minister of Parliament Greg Rickford, the blame was on the Ontario Government which transferred money into an "Officer Recruitment Fund" to hire more officers, without a plan on what to do once the Officer Recruitment Fund was used up.

In an effort to keep Treaty Three Police Service in existence, Police Chief Conrad Delaronde and the Chiefs of the communities it serves, had ignored the collective bargaining agreement, introduced a number of cost-cutting measures such as wage cuts, and eliminated paid maternity leave, which effectively reversed a recent arbitration decision to bring the officers to OPP parity.

The Treaty Three Police Officers Union opposed these measures and requested the Board of Directors abide by the current contract, which expires in March 2014. According to Treaty Three Police Service management and the Chiefs of the communities, unless costs are drastically cut or a funding increase from the Federal or Provincial governments happens - the Chiefs have elected to disband the Police Service entirely to prevent the First Nations from accruing more financial obligations (the First Nations will be liable for any debts incurred by the Police Service). The officers were given 45 days notice. According to the Policing Agreement between Grand Council Treaty Three, the Ontario Government, and the Federal Government, withdrawal requires 12 months notice.

Within hours of the announcement, a grassroots Facebook movement arose to generate support for the officers, questioning the speed, wisdom and legality of the decision to "bust the union".

After a series of meetings and talks the Chiefs dissolved the old board and replaced those members with Chiefs that essentially worked to replace themselves with community members within months and renew the fight for adequate funding. In a surprise move, Chief Delaronde, Deputy Chief Armstrong and Deputy Chief Indian all resigned. The PSAC and Board then went to closed doors meetings. By the time Chief Delaronde relinquished command to Interim Chief of Police Dan Davidson, and after a number of controversial changes began to affect the budget, T3PS was in better, albeit still underfunded state. The layoff notice was then rescinded by Chief Davidson and the new board in preparation for a new effort to work with the officers and PSAC to negotiate a new contract, seek better funding while addressing community concerns within the current budget.

As of April 2014, little to no progress was made in negotiations. Part of the problem was the board, not yet transitioned back to civilian control, had not completed the process for hiring a new Chief of Police to replace Chief Davidson. On a positive note, T3PS was in the process of restoring its authorized strength by a combination of experienced and new hires.

Less than a year later Louie Napish returned to T3PS to serve as Chief of Police. By fall of 2014 the board will have completed transition into a civilian board.
