= Rainy Lake and River Bands of Saulteaux =

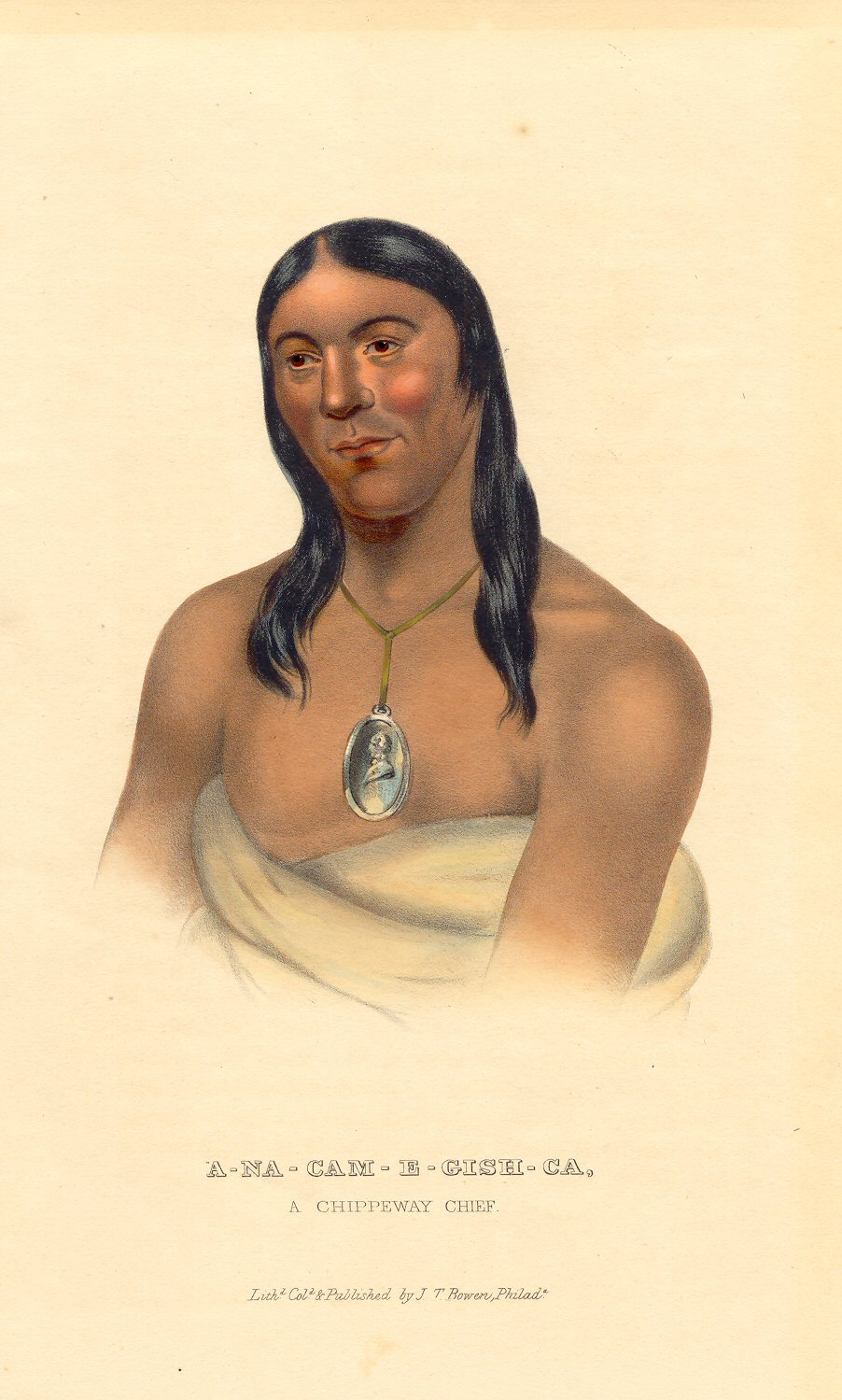
A-na-cam-e-gish-ca (Enakamigishkang / "[Traces of] Foot Prints [upon the Ground]"), Rainy Lake Ojibwe chief, painted by Charles Bird King during the 1826 Treaty of Fond du Lac; published in History of the Indian Tribes of North America.

Rainy Lake and River Bands of Saulteaux (Ojibwe language: Gojijiwininiwag) are Saulteaux (Ojibwe) group located in Northwestern Ontario and northern Minnesota, along and about the Rainy Lake and the Rainy River, known in Ojibwe as Gojijiing.

Through Treaty of Paris (1783) and the Webster-Ashburton Treaty (1842), the Gojijiwininiwag were split between those in the United States and those in the British North America (which later became Canada). The Gojijiwininiwag in Canada became parties to Treaty 3.

In Canada, the communities forming the Rainy Lake and River Bands of Saulteaux interacted with the Canadian government with Department of Indian Affairs (today, Aboriginal Affairs and Northern Development Canada) through the Couchiching Agency, Fort Frances, Ontario, from 1871−1903, after which the agency became the Fort Frances Agency. Rainy River Bands at one time had a joint Indian reserve known as the "Wild Land 15M." The Rainy Lake Bands still have a joint reserve known as the Agency 1.

== Ethnonyms ==
The Rainy Lake and River Bands of Saulteaux are named after their location of Rainy Lake and Rainy River, which in the Ojibwe language are Gojiji-zaaga'igan and Gojiji-ziibi, respectively. Handbook of North American Indians record other variations of their names. The locative form of the region — gojijiing — is the basis for names of Koochiching County, Minnesota and Couchiching First Nation.

- Algonquins of Rainy Lake — Lewis and Clark, Travels, 55, 1806.
- Ko^{1}che^{1}che^{1} Wenenewak — Long, Expedition of St. Peter's River, II, 153, 1824
- Ko-je-je-win-in-e-wug — Warren (1842) in Minnesota Historical Society Collections, V, 84, 1885.
- Kotchitchi-wininiwak — Gatschet, Ojibwa MS., BAE, 1882.
- Kutcitciwininiwag — William Jones, information, 1906.
- Lac la Pluie Indians — Hind, Red River Expedition, I, 82, 1860
- Rainy Lake Indians — Schoolcraft (1838) in H.R. Doc. 107, 25th Congress, 3d. session, 9, 1839.
- Tecamamiouen — La Chauvignerie (1736) in New York Document on Colonial History, IX, 1054, 1855.

== Bands ==
Rainy Lake Bands of Saulteaux

- Couchiching First Nation, Fort Frances, Ontario
- Naicatchewenin First Nation, Devlin, Ontario
- Nigigoonsiminikaaning First Nation, Fort Frances, Ontario — formerly known as the Nicickousemenecaning First Nation and as the Red Gut First Nation.
- Stanjikoming First Nation, Fort Frances, Ontario

Rainy River Bands of Saulteaux

- Lac La Croix First Nation, Fort Frances, Ontario — formed from two historical bands:
  - Lac La Croix Band of Rainy River Saulteaux — on Lac La Croix Indian Reserve 25D (now known as Neguagon Lake Indian Reserve 25D)
  - Sturgeon Lake Band of Rainy River Saulteaux — was on Sturgeon Lake Indian Reserve 24C until the Reserve was delisted by the Ontario Provincial Park Act in 1950, took this Indian reserve and made it part of Quetico Provincial Park.
- Little Forks Band of Rainy River Saulteaux [United States] — the southern half of the Little Forks Band of Rainy River Saulteaux [Canada] (below), and are now part of Bois Forte Band of Chippewa, Nett Lake, Koochiching County, Minnesota.
- Rainy River First Nations, Manitou Rapids, Ontario — six of the seven historical Rainy River Saulteaux bands sold their Reserves in 1914-1915 and then began the amalgamation into a single Band. The Canadian federal government made the amalgamation official in the 1960s. The seven historical Saulteaux bands forming this First Nation are:
  - Hungry Hall 1 Band of Rainy River Saulteaux
  - Hungry Hall 2 Band of Rainy River Saulteaux
  - Little Forks Band of Rainy River Saulteaux [Canada] — northern half of the Little Forks Band of Rainy River Saulteaux [United States].
  - Long Sault 1 Band of Rainy River Saulteaux
  - Long Sault 2 Band of Rainy River Saulteaux
  - Manitou Rapids 1 Band of Rainy River Saulteaux
  - Manitou Rapids 2 Band of Rainy River Saulteaux
- Seine River First Nation, Mine Centre, Ontario
