= Saulteaux =

Westernmost branch of the Anishinaabe people

Anishinaabe, Nakawē ᐊᓂᔑᓈᐯ, ᓇᐦᑲᐍ
- Homelands of Anishinaabe and Anishinini, c. 1800

Regions with significant populations
- Canada (Ontario, Manitoba, Saskatchewan, Alberta, British Columbia); United States (Michigan)

Languages
- English, French, Western Ojibwa

Religion
- Midewiwin, Catholicism, Methodism, and others

Related ethnic groups
- Odawa, Ojibwe, Potawatomi, Oji-Cree, Algonquin

- Person: Nakawē ᓇᐦᑲᐍ; Ojibwe ᐅᒋᐺ; Anihšināpē ᐊᓂᔑᓈᐯ
- People: Nakawēk ᓇᐦᑲᐍ; Ojibweg ᐅᒋᐺᒃ / ᐅᒋᐺᐠ; Anihšināpēk ᐊᓂᔑᓈᐯᐠ
- Language: Nakawēmowin ᓇᐦᑲᐌᒧᐎᓐ; Ojibwemowin ᐅᒋᐺᒧᐎᓐ; Anihšināpēmowin ᐊᓂᐦᔑᓈᐯᒧᐎᓐ; Hand Talk
- Country: Nakawēwaki ᓇᐦᑲᐍᐘᑭ; Ojibwewaki ᐅᒋᐻᐘᑭ; Anihšināpēwaki ᐊᓂᔑᓈᐯᐘᑭ

The Saulteaux (pronounced /ˈsɔːltoʊ/, SAWL-toh or in imitation of the French pronunciation /ˈsoʊtoʊ/, SOH-toh; also written Salteaux, Saulteau and other variants), otherwise known as the Plains Ojibwe, Nakawe, or Nakawē, are a First Nations band government in Ontario, Manitoba, Saskatchewan, Alberta and British Columbia, Canada. They are a branch of the Ojibwe who pushed west. They formed a mixed culture of woodlands and plains Indigenous customs and traditions.

== Ethnic classification ==
The Saulteaux are a branch of the Ojibwe Nations within Canada. They are sometimes called the Anihšināpē (Anishinaabe). Saulteaux is a French term meaning 'waters (eaux) - fall (sault)', and by extension "People of the rapids/water falls", referring to their former location in the area of Sault Ste. Marie, Ontario, on the St. Marys River (Michigan–Ontario), which connects Lake Superior with Lake Huron. They are primarily hunters and fishers, and when still the primary dwellers of their sovereign land, they had extensive trading relations with the French, British and later Americans at that post.

== Location ==
The Saulteaux historically were settled around Lake Superior and Lake Winnipeg, principally in the areas of present-day Sault Ste. Marie and northern Michigan. Pressure from European Canadians and Americans gradually pushed the tribe westward to Manitoba, Saskatchewan and Alberta, with one community in British Columbia. Today most of the Saulteaux live in the Interlake District; Swan River, Duck Bay, Camperville, the southern part of Manitoba, and in Saskatchewan (Kamsack and surrounding areas). Because they were forced to move to land ill-suited for European crops, they were lucky to escape European-Canadian competition for their lands and have kept much of that assigned territory in reserves. Generally, the Saulteaux have three major divisions.

=== Ontario Saulteaux ===
The Eastern Saulteaux, better known as the Ontario Saulteaux, are located around Rainy Lake and Lake of the Woods in Northwestern Ontario and southeastern Manitoba. Many of the Ontario Saulteaux First Nations are signatories to Treaty 3. Their form of Anishinaabemowin (Anishinaabe language) is sometimes called Northwestern Ojibwa language (ISO 639-3: OJB), or simply Ojibwemowin (Ojibwe). Today English is the first language of many members. The Ontario Saulteaux culture is descended from the Eastern Woodlands culture.

=== Manitoba Saulteaux ===
The Central Saulteaux, better known as Manitoba Saulteaux, are found primarily in eastern and southern Manitoba, extending west into southern Saskatchewan. During the late 18th century and early 19th century, as partners with the Cree in the fur trade, the Saulteaux migrated northwest into the Swan River and Cumberland districts of west-central Manitoba, and into Saskatchewan along the Assiniboine River, as far its confluence with the Souris (Mouse) River. Once established in the area, the Saulteaux adapted some of the cultural traits of their allies, the Plains Cree and Assiniboine.

Consequently, together with the Western Saulteaux, the Manitoba Saulteaux are sometimes called Plains Ojibwe. Many of the Manitoba Saulteaux First Nations are signatories to Treaty 1 and Treaty 2. The Manitoba Saulteaux culture is a transitional one from the Eastern Woodlands culture of their Ontario Saulteaux neighbours and Plains culture of the Western Saulteaux neighbours. Often, the term Bungi or Bungee (from bangii, meaning "a little bit") has been used to refer to either the Manitoba Saulteaux (who resemble the Cree in culture) or their Métis population (who are a little bit Anishinaabe). The language of their Métis population is described as the Bungi language.

=== Western Saulteaux ===
The Western Saulteaux are found primarily in central Saskatchewan, but extend east into southwestern Manitoba and west into central Alberta and eastern British Columbia. They call themselves Nakawē (ᓇᐦᑲᐍ)—an autonym that is a general term for the Saulteaux. The neighbouring Plains Cree call them the Nahkawiyiniw (ᓇᐦᑲᐏᔨᓂᐤ), a word of related etymology. Their form of Anishinaabemowin (Anishinaabe language), known as Nakawēmowin (ᓇᐦᑲᐍᒧᐏᐣ) or Western Ojibwa language (ISO 639-3: OJW), is also an Algonquian language. Like most First Nations, most members use English as the first language. Many of the Western Saulteaux First Nations are signatories to Treaty 4 and Treaty 6; Saulteau First Nations in North Eastern British Columbia are a signatory to Treaty 8. The Western Saulteaux culture is that of the Plains culture.

== Communities ==
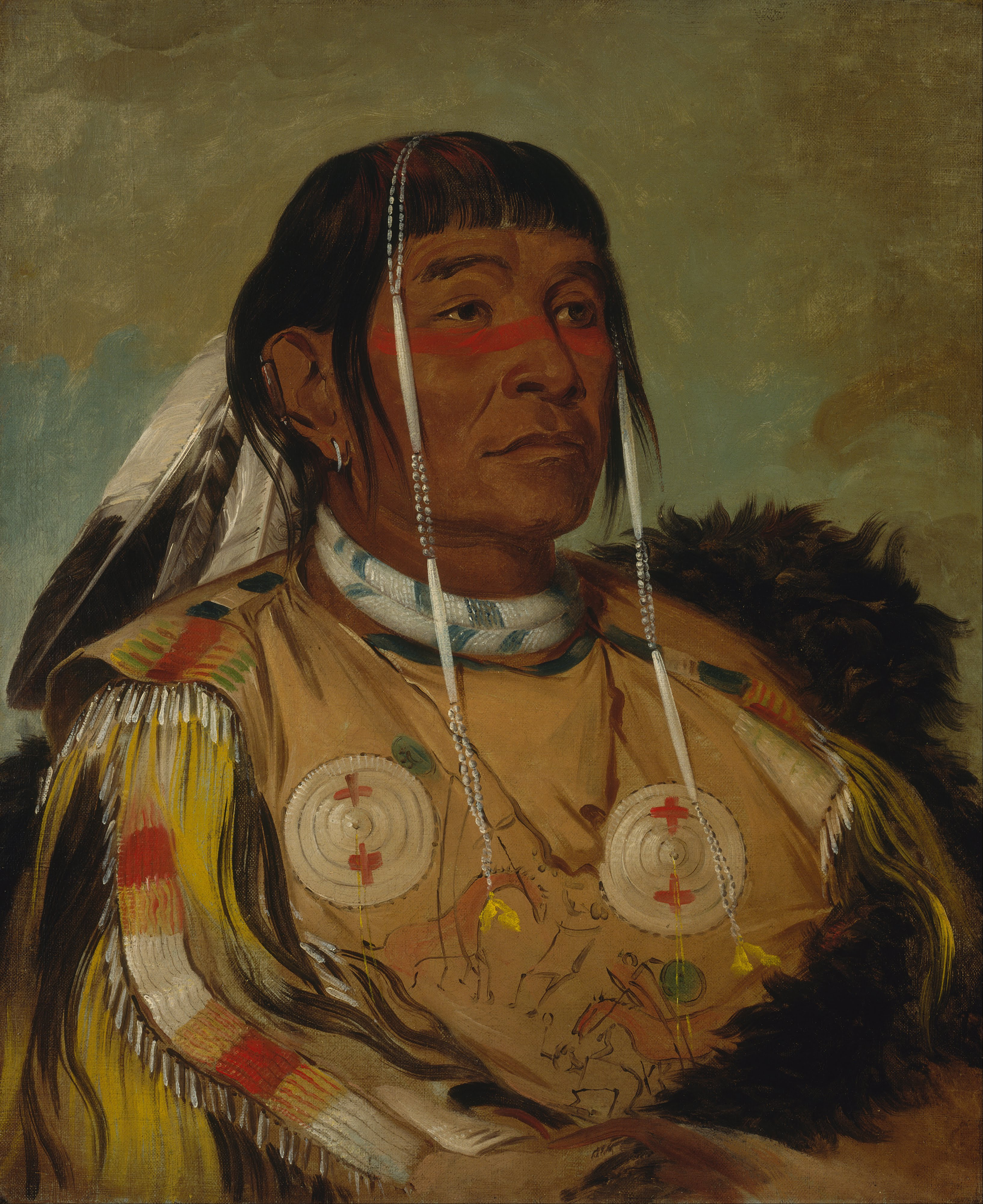
Sha-có-pay, The Six, Chief of the Plains Ojibwa

Population figures are as of May 2013, unless noted otherwise.

- Asubpeeschoseewagong First Nation (formerly: Grassy Narrows First Nation (Ontario))(population 1,326)
- Berens River First Nation, Berens River, MB (population 1851 on-reserve)
- Buffalo Point First Nation, Buffalo Point, MB (population 110)
- Cote First Nation, Kamsack, SK (population 3,059)
- Cowessess First Nation, Cowessess, SK (population 3,570) (part Cree)
- Eagle Lake First Nation, Migisi Sahgaigan, ON (population 458 in 2006)
- Ebb and Flow First Nation, Ebb and Flow, MB (population 2,467)
- Gordon First Nation, Punnichy, SK (population 3,065)
- Iskatewizaagegan 39 Independent First Nation, Kejick, ON (population 568)
- Keeseekoose First Nation, Kamsack, SK (population 2,145)
- The Key First Nation, Norquay, SK (population 1,114)
- Lac des Bois Band of Saulteaux (Historical)
  - Big Grassy First Nation, Morson, ON (population 660)
  - Anishnaabeg of Naongashiing First Nation (Big Island), Morson, ON (population 360)
  - Northwest Angle 33 First Nation (population 454)
  - Northwest Angle 37 First Nation (population 338)
  - Niisaachewan Anishinaabe Nation, Kenora, ON
  - Ojibways of Onigaming First Nation (population 706)
  - Anishinabe of Wauzhushk Onigum First Nation, Kenora, ON (population 622)
- Lac des Mille Lacs First Nation (population 522)
- Muscowpetung First Nation, Fort Qu'Appelle SK (population 1,183)
- Muskowekwan First Nation Lestock, SK (population 1,524)
- Naotkamegwanning First Nation (formerly: Whitefish Bay First Nation), Pawitik, ON (population 1,109)
- Obashkaandagaang Bay First Nation (population 280)
- O-Chi-Chak-Ko-Sipi First Nation (population 600)
- O'Chiese First Nation, Rocky Mountain House, AB (population 963)
- Pasqua First Nation, Fort Qu'Appelle, SK (population 1,775) (part Cree)
- Pauingassi First Nation, Pauingass, MB (population 575)
- Pinaymootang First Nation, Fairford, MB (population 2500+)
- Pine Creek First Nation, Pine Creek MB (population 2,730)
- Poorman's Band of Cree (historical)—primarily Cree but historically part Saulteaux
  - Kawacatoose First Nation, Raymore, SK (population 2,748)
  - Muskowekwan First Nation
- Poplar River First Nation, Poplar River, MB (population 1,439)
- Portage Band of Saulteaux (Historical)
  - Long Plain First Nation, Portage la Prairie, MB (population 3,388 in 2006)
  - Sandy Bay First Nation (formerly: White Mud Band of Saulteaux), Marius, MB (population 5,521)
  - Swan Lake First Nation, Swan Lake, MB (population 1,206)
- Rainy Lake Band of Saulteaux (Historical)
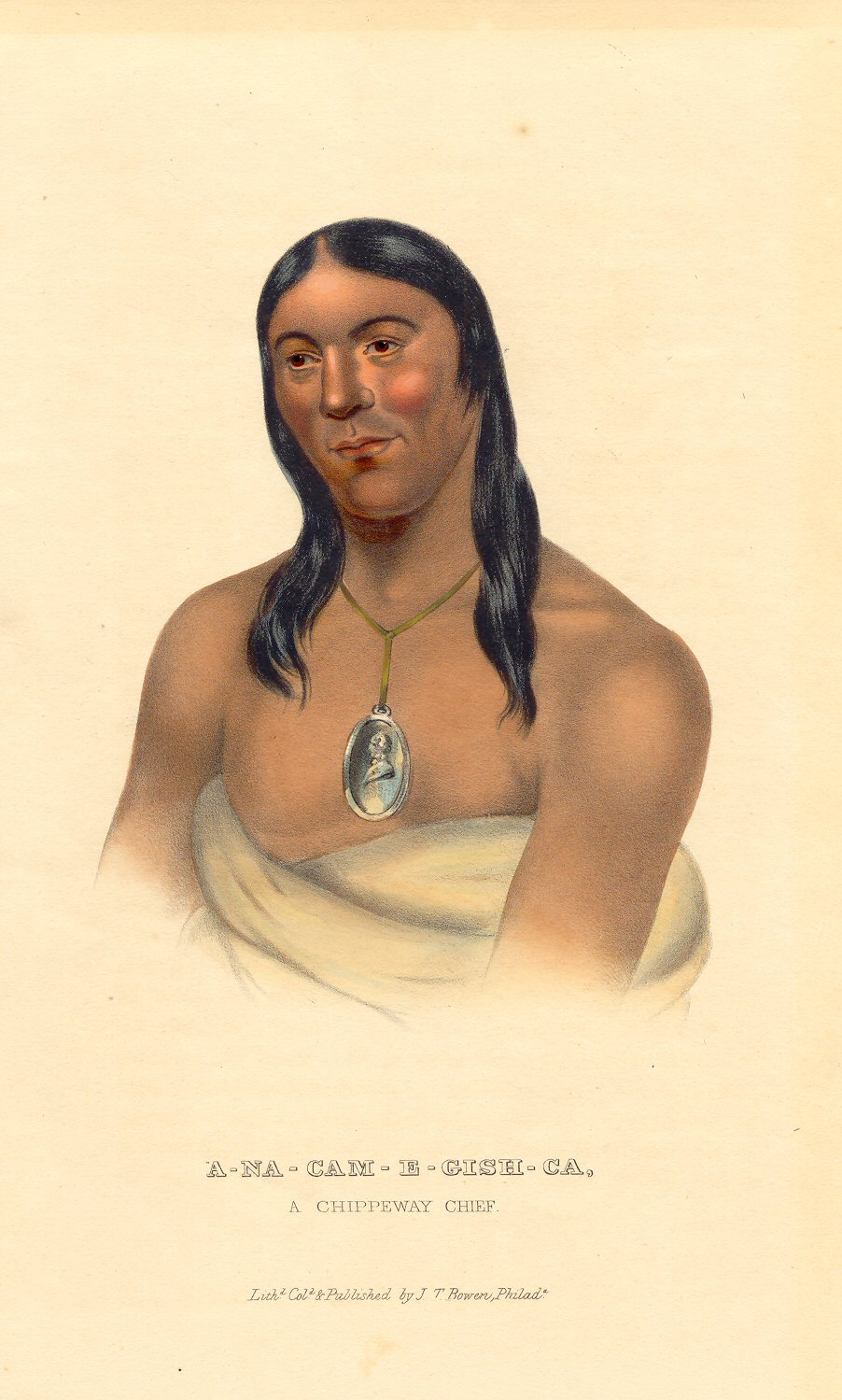
  A-na-cam-e-gish-ca (Aanakamigishkaang / "[Traces of] Foot Prints [upon the Ground]"), Rainy Lake Ojibwe chief, painted by Charles Bird King during the 1826 Treaty of Fond du Lac and published in History of the Indian Tribes of North America
  - Couchiching First Nation, Fort Frances, ON (population 1,989)
  - Naicatchewenin First Nation, Devlin, ON (population 370)
  - Nigigoonsiminikaaning (Nicickousemenecaning) First Nation, Fort Frances, ON (population 293)
  - Stanjikoming First Nation, Fort Frances, ON (population 142)
- Rainy River Bands of Saulteaux (Historical)
  - Lac La Croix First Nation, Fort Frances, ON (population 397)
    - Lac La Croix Band of Rainy River Saulteaux (Historical)—on Lac La Croix Indian Reserve 25D (now known as Neguagon Lake Indian Reserve 25D)
    - Sturgeon Lake Band of Rainy River Saulteaux (Historical)— as on Sturgeon Lake Indian Reserve 24C until the Reserve was delisted by the Ontario Provincial Park Act in 1950, took this Indian reserve and made it part of Quetico Provincial Park.
  - Rainy River First Nations, Manitou Rapids, ON (population 767 in 2006)
    - Hungry Hall 1 Band of Rainy River Saulteaux (Historical)
    - Hungry Hall 2 Band of Rainy River Saulteaux (Historical)
    - Little Forks Band of Rainy River Saulteaux (Historical)[Canada]— Little Forks Band of Rainy River Saulteaux (Historical)[United States], the southern half of the former, became part of Bois Forte Band of Chippewa.
    - Long Sault 1 Band of Rainy River Saulteaux (Historical)
    - Long Sault 2 Band of Rainy River Saulteaux (Historical)
    - Manitou Rapids 1 of Rainy River Saulteaux (Historical)
    - Manitou Rapids 2 of Rainy River Saulteaux (Historical)
  - Seine River First Nation, Mine Centre, ON (population 697)
- Sagkeeng First Nation (formerly Fort Alexander First Nation), Fort Alexander, MB (population 6,844)
- St. Peter's Band of Cree and Saulteaux (Historical)—primarily Cree but historically part Saulteaux
  - Muskoday First Nation (formerly: John Smith First Nation), Muskoday, SK (population 1,579)
  - Peguis First Nation, Peguis, MB (population 8,410)
- Saulteau First Nations, Moberly Lake, BC (population 792 in 2006)
- Saulteaux First Nation, Cochin, SK (population 1,157)
- Shoal Lake 40 First Nation, Shoal Lake, ON (population 542)
- Skownan First Nation (formerly: Waterhen River Band of Saulteaux), Skownan, MB (population 1,246)
- Tootinaowaziibeeng Treaty Reserve, Shortdale, Manitoba (population 1,667)
- Wabaseemoong Independent Nations (formerly: Islington Band of Saulteaux), Whitedog, ON (1,716)
  - One Man Lake Band of Saulteaux (Historical)
  - Swan Lake Band of Saulteaux (Historical)
  - Whitedog Band of Saulteaux (Historical)
- Wabauskang First Nation (population 257)
- Wabigoon Lake Ojibway Nation (population 541)
- White Bear First Nations, Carlyle, SK—Multitribal band of Plains Cree, Saulteaux, Nakota and Dakota First Nations (population 2805)
- Yellow-quill Band of Saulteaux (Historical)
  - Fishing Lake First Nation
  - Kinistin Saulteaux Nation
  - Yellow Quill First Nation (formerly: Nut Lake Band of Saulteaux)
- Zagime Anishinabek, Grenfell, SK (population 1,404) (formerly Sakimay First Nation, part Cree)

== Notable Saulteaux ==
- Adam Beach, actor known for his work in Flags of Our Fathers, Windtalkers and Arctic Air.
- Phil Fontaine, former National Chief, Assembly of First Nations
- Robert Houle, artist, critic, and curator
- Al Hunter, Anishinaabe writer and poet
- Wilma Pelly, actor
- Jennifer Podemski, actor
- Tamara Podemski, actor. Known for playing Bharadwaj in Murderbot. Sister of Jennifer Podemski.
- Tommy Prince, one of Canada's most decorated First Nations soldiers
- Henry Boucha, former NHL player and Olympian
