= Pwi-Di-Goo-Zing Ne-Yaa-Zhing Advisory Services =

Regional Chiefs' Council in Rainy River District, Ontario, Canada

Coordinates: 48°37′17″N 93°21′38″W

Pwi-Di-Goo-Zing Ne-Yaa-Zhing Advisory Services is a non-profit Regional Chiefs' Council located in the Rainy River District, Ontario, Canada, serving seven First Nations by providing advisory services and training which will enhance the overall management skills and opportunities of the area's First Nations.

== Governance ==
The Advisory Services was originally formed to serve the ten area Ojibwa First Nations within the Rainy River District. As of April 1, 1998, they are governed by a board of directors, which consists of one representative from each of the remaining seven member First Nations:

- Anishnaabeg of Naongashiing (Big Island First Nation) (former member)
- Big Grassy First Nation (former member)
- Couchiching First Nation
- Lac La Croix First Nation
- Naicatchewenin First Nation
- Nigigoonsiminikaaning First Nation
- Ojibways of Onigaming First Nation (former member)
- Rainy River First Nations
- Seine River First Nation
- Stanjikoming First Nation

In turn, the seven member First Nations are also members of the Grand Council of Treaty 3, a Tribal Political Organization located in the Treaty 3 area of Ontario and Manitoba. The three former members are now members of Anishinabeg of Kabapikotawangag Resource Council, another non-profit Regional Chiefs' Council based out of Sioux Narrows, Ontario.

== Departments ==
Located on the Agency 1 Indian Reserve, immediately east of Fort Frances, Ontario, the Advisory Service provides the following services to its member First Nations:

- Administration
- Economic Development
- Finance
- Fire Prevention/Protection
- Housing
- Human Resources
- Indian Registration
- Membership
- Technical Services
