= Treaty 3 =

Treaty between First Nations and Canadian Crown

Treaty 3 is an agreement entered into on October 3, 1873, by Chief Mikiseesis (Little Eagle) on behalf of the Ojibwe First Nations and Queen Victoria. The treaty ceded a vast tract of Ojibwe territory, including large parts of what is now northwestern Ontario and a small part of eastern Manitoba, to the Government of Canada. Treaty 3 also provides for rights for the Waasaakode Anishinaabe ("light skinned Anishinaabe") and other Ojibwe, through a series of agreements signed over the next year. The treaty was modified in 1875 when Nicolas Chatelain negotiated an adhesion that created a reserve, surveyed as reserve 16A, for Métis families connected to Mikiseesis' Rainy Lake Band. Reserve 16A and the Rainy Lake Band reserve were unified in 1967.

It is the third in a series of eleven numbered treaties between the Crown and First Nation band governments. Despite being the third of these treaties it is more historically significant in that its text and terms served as the model for the remainder of the numbered treaties. Treaties 1 and 2 cover an area about the same size and had to be amended to reflect some of the developments arising out of the negotiation of Treaty 3. At the time that it was negotiated it was anticipated that the terms of Treaty 3 would serve as a model for future treaties and would require the amendment of Treaties 1 and 2.

Treaty 3 has particular historical significance because of the litigation that ensued between the Crown in Right of Ontario and the Crown in Right of Canada over the significance of the treaty and the respective roles of Canada and the provinces in relation to aboriginal peoples. The first of these cases is St. Catherines Milling v. The Queen which dealt with the question of the ownership of lands subject to a treaty (a question that was decided in favour of the Province). The second, The Dominion of Canada v The Province of Ontario, dealt with the question of whether or not Ontario had to indemnify Canada for the expenses incurred in negotiating the treaty and the ongoing costs of fulfilling the treaty obligations. Canada lost this case as well with the Supreme Court of Canada and the Privy Council holding that Canada was responsible for Indian affairs and the welfare of Indians and that the treaty had been negotiated to achieve broad national purposes (such as the building of the transcontinental railway) rather than to benefit Ontario. The significance of these decisions is still a matter of discussion in the Canadian courts.

Treaty 3 is also significant as there exists a written record of the native peoples' understanding of the treaty. This is known as the Paypom document. It is a series of notes that were written for Chief Powassin during the treaty negotiations, and documents the promises that were made to the First Nations people. The promises in the Paypom document differ in a number of ways from the printed version available from the Canadian government.

== Signatory First Nations (sorted by present day tribal affiliations) ==
  - Big Grassy First Nation
  - Anishnaabeg of Naongashiing (Big Island First Nation)
  - Northwest Angle 33 First Nation
  - Northwest Angle 37 First Nation
  - Ojibways of Onigaming First Nation
  - Anishinabe of Wauzhushk Onigum (Wauzhusk Onigum First Nation)
- Bimose Tribal Council
  - Asubpeeschoseewagong First Nation (Grassy Narrows First Nation)
  - Eagle Lake First Nation
  - Iskatewizaagegan 39 Independent First Nation
  - Lac des Mille Lacs First Nation
  - Naotkamegwanning First Nation
  - Obashkaandagaang Bay First Nation
  - Niisaachewan Anishinaabe Nation
  - Shoal Lake 40 First Nation
  - Wabaseemoong Independent Nations
  - Wabauskang First Nation
  - Wabigoon Lake Ojibway Nation
- Pwi-Di-Goo-Zing Ne-Yaa-Zhing Advisory Services
  - Couchiching First Nation
  - Lac La Croix First Nation
  - Mitaanjigamiing First Nation
  - Naicatchewenin First Nation
  - Nigigoonsiminikaaning First Nation
  - Rainy River First Nation
  - Seine River First Nation
  - Stanjikoming First Nation
- Independent First Nations Alliance
  - Lac Seul First Nation
- Unaffiliated
  - Ojibway Nation of Saugeen First Nation

== See also ==
- Numbered Treaties
- The Canadian Crown and Aboriginal peoples
