= Grand Council of Treaty 3 =

Canadian political organization

Grand Council of Treaty 3 (GCT3) is a political organization representing 24 First Nation communities across Treaty 3 areas of northern Ontario and southeastern Manitoba, Canada, and four additional First Nations, specifically in regard to their Treaty rights.

== Mandate ==
The GCT3 operates under the mandate in which their direction of the leadership and benefit/protection of the Citizens are carried out by the administrative office of GCT3 to protect, preserve and enhance Treaty and Aboriginal rights. These points are upheld by GCT3 by advancing the exercise of inherent jurisdiction, sovereignty, nation-building, and traditional governance with the aim to preserve and build the Anishinaabe Nation's goal of self-determination.

== Departments ==
- Administrative Office
- Bimiiwinitisowin Omaa Akiing (Governance on Our Land)
- Child Care
- Culture and Citizenship
- Economic Development
- Education
- Health
- Housing / Infrastructure
- Internal / External Relations
- Justice
- Natural Resources
- Social Services
- Treaty and Aboriginal Rights Research
- Trapping
- Youth and Recreation

== Affiliated First Nations ==
- Anishinabeg of Kabapikotawangag Resource Council
  - Animakee Wa Zhing 37
  - Big Grassy
  - Naongashiing (Big Island)
  - Northwest Angle 33
  - Onigaming
  - Wauzhushk Onigum
- Bimose Tribal Council
  - Asubpeeschoseewagong (Grassy Narrows)
  - Eagle Lake
  - Iskatewizaagegan 39
  - Lac des Mille Lacs
  - Naotkamegwanning (Whitefish Bay)
  - Obashkaandagaang Bay
  - Niisaachewan Anishinaabe Nation
  - Shoal Lake 40
  - Wabaseemoong (Whitedog)
  - Wabauskang
  - Wabigoon Lake
- Pwi-Di-Goo-Zing Ne-Yaa-Zhing Advisory Services
  - Couchiching
  - Lac La Croix
  - Naicatchewenin
  - Nigigoonsiminikaaning
  - Rainy River
  - Seine River
  - Mitaanjigamiing First Nation

== Non-affiliated First Nations ==
Though signatories to Treaty 3, the following First Nations are not members of the Grand Council of Treaty 3. However, as the Grand Council is the treaty administrant, the Grand Council works closely with these non-affiliated First Nations:

- Buffalo Point
- Lac Seul
- Sagkeeng (Fort Alexander) Sagkeeng First Nation is a non-signatory to Treaty 3. Sagkeeng First Nation is a signatory to Treaty 1.
- Saugeen

== See also ==
- Treaty Three Police Service
