= Lake of the Woods Provincial Park =

Protected area in Ontario, Canada

- IUCN category II (national park)
- Location within Ontario
- Location: Kenora District/Rainy River District, Ontario, Canada
- Coordinates: 49°01′41″N 94°37′49″W
- Area: 20,675.00 ha (79.8266 sq mi)
- Designation: Natural environment
- Established: 1967
- Named for: Lake of the Woods
- Governing body: Ontario Parks
- Website: www.ontarioparks.com/park/lakeofthewoods

Lake of the Woods Provincial Park is a provincial park in northwestern Ontario, Canada. It protects several islands in Lake of the Woods, in both Kenora and Rainy River Districts. It was established in 1967 and expanded with 11,800 hectares (29,000 acres) in 1985. It provides backcountry camping opportunities.

== Description ==
The park includes Bigsby, Coste (partially), Dawson, De Noyon, Falcon, Kennedy, Lily, Painted Rock, Skeet (partially), Splitrock, and The Three Sisters Islands, as well as the western tip of the Aulneau Peninsula. The islands added to the park in 1985 (Bigsby, Dawson, Painted Rock, Splitrock, and The Three Sisters) are classified as a nature reserve zone, and therefore, future development of them will be limited. A mainland portion of the park was deregulated as a provincial park in 1998.

The islands have similar terrain which includes rolling bedrock uplands mixed with many lakes and other wetlands. Notable features of the park include two pictograph sites, a graveyard, and white pelican and double-crested cormorant nesting sites (that feed in the waters off Bigsby and The Three Sister Islands).

Lake of the Woods Provincial Park is a non-operating park. There are no services provided, and the only facilities are 25 backcountry campsites. Permitted activities include camping and hunting.

== Former mainland portion ==
The Lake of the Woods Provincial Park originally had a mainland portion along the lake's southeastern shore. This land was initially intended to become Reserve No. 35E for the Assabaska First Nation under the terms of Treaty 3 (signed in 1873). Because the land was never surveyed and through negligence and lack of consultation, the reserve was never created and the land was transferred from the federal to the provincial government in 1958. After it became a provincial park, the campground was a loss leader, losing thousands of dollars per year.

In 1977, the First Nations of Mishkosiiniiziibing (Big Grassy River) and the Ojibways of Onigaming (successors to the Assabaska First Nation) filed a land claim, which was settled in the late 1990s. As part of the settlement, the mainland portion of the park was deregulated, and converted into the Assabaska Reserve for the Big Grassy and Ojibways of Onigaming First Nations. It remains a campground, now known as Assabaska Ojibway Heritage Park.
