= Seven Generations Education Institute =

University in Ontario, Canada

- Motto: Culturally enriched quality education for all
- Type: Aboriginal-owned and controlled education institution
- Established: 1985 as Rainy Lake Ojibway Education Authority
- Affiliations: Indian & Northern Affairs Canada, and the Ontario Ministry of Education,
- Students: secondary programs, degree programs, certificate programs, diploma programs and pre-employment training
- Undergraduates: university, and continuing education students
- Location: 1452 Idylwild Drive, Fort Frances, Ontario, Ontario, Canada; 48.62872°N 93.35982°W
- Website: 7generations.org

Seven Generations Education Institute is an Aboriginal-owned and controlled post-secondary institution, co-founded by the ten bands in the Rainy Lake Tribal area in 1985. The ten bands are: Big Grassy, Big Island, Couchiching, Lac La Croix, Naicatchewenin, Nigigoonsiminikaaning, Ojibways of Onigaming, Rainy River, Seine River and Mitaanjigamiing. Each of the bands appointed one member to the board of directors of Seven Generations Education Institute, which functions with the leadership of the Executive Director.

Aboriginal institutes partner with colleges and universities to offer students degree programs, apprenticeships, certificate programs and diploma programs. Seven Generations was founded to provide greater access to post-secondary education for Aboriginal peoples. It delivers post-secondary programs approved by the Ministry of Training, Colleges and Universities. The educational curriculum was adapted to meet the needs of Aboriginal learners to ensure it reflects community needs, cultural heritage and identity.

== Campus ==
Fort Frances Main Campus is 1455 Idylwild Drive Nanicost Complex P.O. Box 297 Fort Frances, ON P9A 3M6. The Thunder Bay Office is 409 George St., Main Floor Thunder Bay, ON P7E 5Y9. The Kenora Office is 240 Veteran's Drive Kenora, ON P9N 3X7.

== History ==
The Rainy Lake Ojibway Education Authority was founded in 1985; Its initial role was one of an advisory capacity since college and university programs were offered through agreements with public colleges and universities. The Rainy Lake Ojibway Education Authority officially changed its name to Seven Generations Education Institute effective July 1, 1999.

Seven Generations provides educational instruction at the secondary, post-secondary and vocational levels. Students consist of adults seeking skill training and adult returnees who wish to gain knowledge in specific course content or a secondary school graduation diploma in preparation for Post-Secondary Education.

== Partnerships ==
Seven Generations offers programs and courses of study in partnership with all levels of government; commissions; industries; commerce and other education and training institutions.

As of 2013, Seven Generations has partnered with the Rainy River District School Board, the Ministry of Education, and local First Nations’ communities in development of new technologies and programs for revitalization of the Ojibwe language.

== Programs offered ==
=== University ===
- Aboriginal Teacher Education Program
- Honours Bachelor of Social Work
- Bachelor of Arts (University Degree Program)
- Master of Social Work 2013

=== College ===
- Andaa Wiinjigewin
- Culinary Skills - Chef Certificate
- Indigenous Wellness and Addictions Certificate/Diploma Program
- Personal Support Worker

=== Continuing Education ===
- Indigenous Preparatory Studies.

== Scholarships & Bursaries ==
The Government of Canada sponsors an Aboriginal Bursaries Search Tool that lists over 680 scholarships, bursaries, and other incentives offered by governments, universities, and industry to support Aboriginal post-secondary participation. Seven Generations scholarships for Aboriginal, First Nations and Métis students include: Sandra Kakeeway Memorial Bursary; Biskaabiyang Bursaries.

== See also ==
- Anishinaabe language dialects
