= Seine River First Nation =

Seine River Seine River Village Horse Collar Junction, Turtle Station
- Indian reserve
- Seine River First Nation
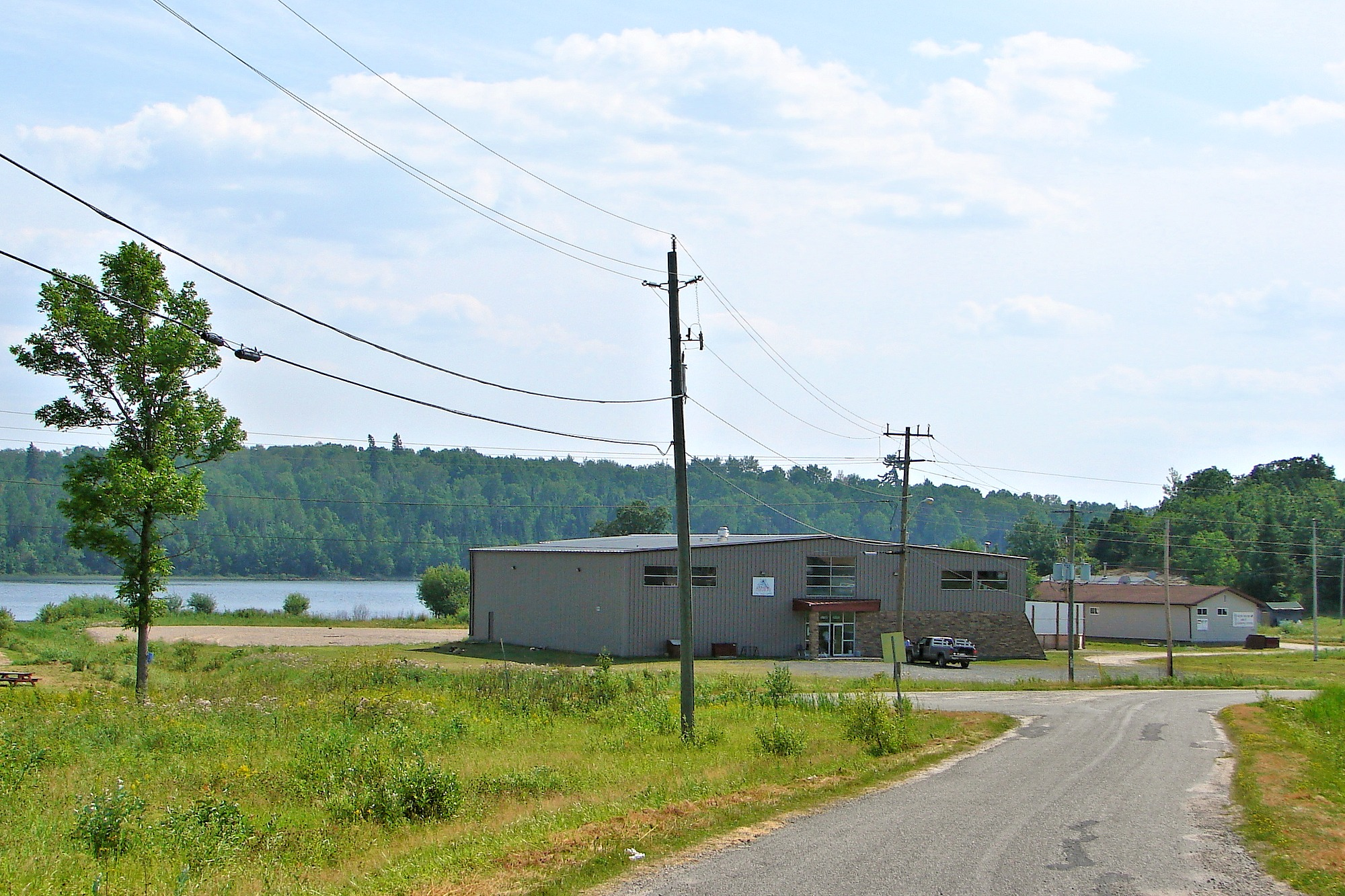

- Seine River First Nations Logo

- Location within Ontario
- Coordinates: 48.72398°N 92.42558°W
- Country: Canada
- Aboriginal People: Anishinaabe
- First Nation: Ojibawe
- Tribe: Saulteaux
- Band: Rainy Lake and Rainy River
- Treaty 3: 1873
- Grand Council: Grand Council of Treaty 3
- Tribal Council: Pwi-di-goo-zing Ne-yaa-zhing
- Reserves: Seine River 23A, Seine River 23B, Sturgeon Falls 23

Government
  - Type: Act Electoral System
  - Body: Band Council
  - Chief: Shane Whitecrowe
  - Councilors: Darcy Whitecrow; Tammy Tania Boshkaykin; Thomas Johnson; John Kabatay; Roger Brian Spencer; Billy Whitecrowe
  - Federal Riding: Thunder Bay—Rainy River
  - Provincial Riding: Kenora—Rainy River

Area
  - Total: 5,152.2 ha (12,731 acres)
  - Populated Areas: 1,758.80 ha (4,346.1 acres)
- Census Statistics suggest only one of three locations is considered populated.
- Elevation: 341 m (1,119 ft)

Population (2011)
  - Total: 271
  - Density: 17.3/km^{2} (45/sq mi)
- Data provided by Statistics Canada and the Ministry of Aboriginal Affairs and Northern Development conflict.

Census Population (2006)
  - Status: 275
  - Non-status: 5

Registered Status (2011)
  - On Reserve: 312
  - Off Reserve: 706
- Time zone: UTC-6 (CST)
  - Summer (DST): UTC-5 (CDT)
- Postal Code: P0W 1H0
- Area code: 807
- Geocode: 6956951
- CGNDB Key: FETBH
- Band Number: 132
- Website: seineriverfirstnation.ca

Seine River First Nation (Ojibwe: Jiima’aaganing), previously known as the Rivière la Seine Band, is an Ojibwe First Nation reserve located roughly 300 kilometres (190 mi) west of Thunder Bay, Ontario. As of November 2011, the First Nation had a total registered population of 725, of which 327 lived on their own reserve.

== Governance ==
The First Nation have an electoral system of government, consisting of a chief and seven councillors forming their council. Chief Carrie Lynn Boshkaykin and councillors Carrie Lynn Boshkaykin, Tammy Tania Boshkaykin, Ronald Jay Friday, Thomas Johnson, John Kabatay, Roger Brian Spencer and Shane Curtis Whitecrow are serving their two-year term that began on February 11, 2020.

The First Nation is a member of the Pwi-Di-Goo-Zing Ne-Yaa-Zhing Advisory Services, a regional Chiefs Council, which in turn is a member of the Grand Council of Treaty 3, a tribal political organization serving many of the First Nations in northwest Ontario and southeast Manitoba.

== History ==
The original Mine Centre was a settlement associated with the gold rush around Shoal Lake with a population of 500. However, many residents moved to the new Mine Centre established by the Canadian Northern Railway after the collapse of the gold rush from 1903 to 1904.

Seven Generations Education Institute (SGEI) is an Aboriginal-owned and controlled post-secondary institution co-founded by the ten bands in the Rainy Lake Tribal area in 1985. The ten bands are: Big Grassy, Big Island, Couchiching, Lac La Croix, Naicatchewenin, Nigigoonsiminikaaning, Ojibways of Onigaming, Rainy River, Seine River and Mitaanjigaming. Each of the ten bands appointed one member to a board of directors of Seven Generations Education Institute, which functions with the leadership of the executive director.

== Reserve ==
The First Nation have reserved for itself three Indian reserve tracts:

- 1,758.8 hectares (4,346 acres) Seine River 23A (Ashkibwaanikaaning in the Ojibwe language), which serves as their main reserve.
- 904.5 hectares (2,235 acres) Seine River 23B (Mitaawangwe-ziibiing in the Ojibwe language)
- 2,488.9 hectares (6,150 acres) Sturgeon Falls 23 (Name-gojijiing in the Ojibwe language)
