= Assabaska =

- Indian reserve
- Assabaska Indian Reserve
- Location within Ontario
- Coordinates: 48°59′N 94°26′W
- Country: Canada
- Province: Ontario
- District: Rainy River
- First Nations: Big Grassy, Onigaming

Area
  - Land: 8.71 km^{2} (3.36 sq mi)

Population (2021)
  - Total: 0

Assabaska is a Saulteaux First Nation reserve in northwestern Ontario on Lake of the Woods. It is shared between the Big Grassy First Nation and the Ojibways of Onigaming First Nation.

The Assabaska reserve was created in 1999 as a part of a land claim settlement in 1999.

== History ==
The lands that are now part of the Assabaska reserve were originally intended to become Reserve No. 35E for the Assabaska First Nation under the terms of Treaty 3, signed in 1873. Because the land was never surveyed and through negligence and lack of consultation, the reserve was never created and the land was transferred from the federal to the provincial government in 1958. In 1967, these lands became part of the mainland portion of the Lake of the Woods Provincial Park. Its campground was a loss leader, losing thousands of dollars per year.

In 1977, the First Nations of Mishkosiiniiziibing (Big Grassy River) and the Ojibways of Onigaming (successors to the Assabaska First Nation) filed a land claim, which was settled in the late 1990s. As part of the settlement, the mainland portion of the provincial park was deregulated, and converted into the Assabaska Reserve. It remains a campground, now known as Assabaska Ojibway Heritage Park.
