= Indigenous police in Canada =

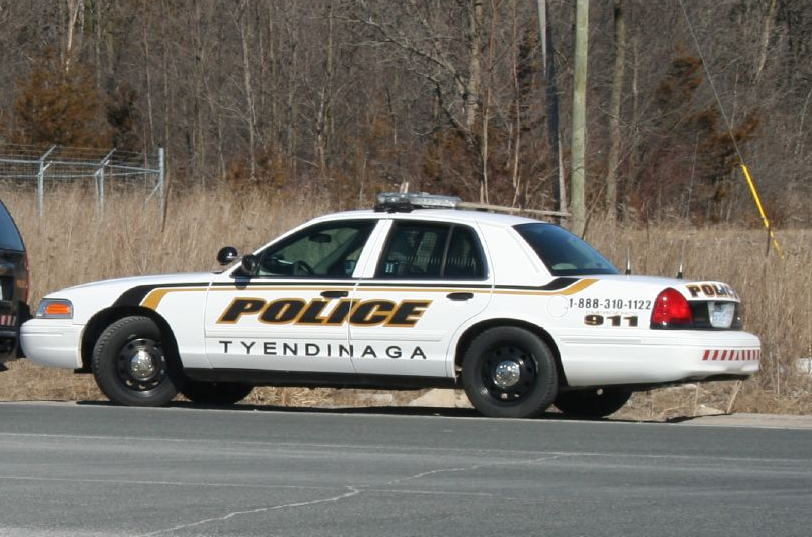
A Tyendinaga Police Service car

Indigenous police services in Canada are police forces under the control of a First Nation or Inuit government.

The power of Indigenous governments to establish independent police services varies, and only First Nations and Inuit communities governed by the Indian Act can establish their own police forces. First Nations and Inuit governments that have completed the comprehensive land claims process, as well as Métis governments, can only contract police services to a third-party police force.

The powers of Indigenous police services also vary; some cannot complete criminal investigations without outside consultation or maintain specialized resources such as police dogs or crime labs.

== History ==
=== Background ===
The policing of Indigenous communities in Canada has long been fraught with racial tension, inequitable police service delivery, and the enforcement of colonial laws and practices. During the federal government's imposition of municipal-style elected councils on First Nations, the Royal Canadian Mounted Police raided the government buildings of traditional Indigenous hereditary chiefs’ councils and oversaw the subsequent council elections — the Six Nations of the Grand River Elected Council was originally referred to as the "Mounties Council."

The RCMP was also involved in enforcing Canada's residential school system—a system that sought to assimilate Indigenous children into Euro-Canadian culture, and was later found to have amounted to cultural genocide—by serving as truant officers, citing parents who refused to allow their children attend residential schools, and routinely assisting Indian agents in bringing children to the schools, sometimes by force.

During the Gustafsen Lake standoff in 1995, an RCMP commander reportedly told a subordinate to kill a prominent Indigenous demonstrator and "smear the prick and everyone with him," and an RCMP media liaison officer was quoted as saying that "smear campaigns are [the RCMP's] specialty." That same year, an Ontario Provincial Police sniper shot and killed an unarmed Indigenous activist, Dudley George, during the Ipperwash Crisis. Between 1990 and 2000, officers of the Saskatoon Police Service took at least four Indigenous people for wintertime "starlight tours," which involved driving drunk or disorderly Indigenous people to Corman Park or distant industrial areas and abandoning them there without suitable clothing.

=== Indigenous-led policing ===
Many Indigenous peoples lived in rural and/or remote locations, which were often served by the same agencies that provided rural policing to the provinces such as the RCMP, Ontario Provincial Police (OPP), and Sûreté du Québec (SQ).

Announced in the early 1960s and beginning in the mid-1960s, the federal government began to withdraw RCMP officers from reserves in the provinces of Ontario and Quebec in favour of provincial control over First Nations policing. The pull-out was officially completed when the "Indian agent" role was abolished in 1971.

At the same time, individual First Nations began to establish self-administered police services, employ non-sworn "band constables" to assist police, or participate in special constabulary programs that facilitated the hiring of Indigenous police officers, creating a decentralized patchwork of police service delivery across Canadian First Nations.

In 1968, the Kahnawake Mohawk Nation established the Kahnawake Peacekeepers, which is the only Indigenous police service in North America composed entirely of Indigenous staff. After the killing of stick-holding Mohawk steelworker David Cross by SQ officers in 1979, Kahnawake leaders warned that SQ officers would be arrested if they tried to enter the territory again.

In 1975, the Ontario Indian Special Constable Program was established by the federal and provincial governments in response to the Ontario Task Force on Policing in 1972. The officers were appointed at the request of chiefs and councils, and these community officers were supported, administratively and operationally, by the OPP. By 1988 the program included 132 officers in over 66 locations. The Amerindian Police Program was also established in 1975, in Quebec.

Dissatisfaction began to grow throughout the 1970s and 1980s with Canada's approaches to policing Indigenous peoples. Although, several communities had established their own independent police services by 1978, these communities, for the most part, were served by the same agencies that provided rural policing to the provinces.

In 1981, the first tripartite policing agreement, involving the federal and Ontario governments and First Nation leaders, was signed in Ottawa, calling for the establishment of the Ontario Indian Police Commission.

=== First Nations Policing Program and beyond ===
The limitations of Indigenous policing arrangements were identified in 25 provincial and federal reports between 1989 and 1992. The reports were unanimous in decrying the effectiveness of the policing of Indigenous people in terms of sensitivity to cultural considerations, lack of community input, biased investigations, minimal crime prevention programming, and fostering alienation from the justice system by Indigenous people.

These reports would lead the federal government to create the First Nations Policing Program in 1992, providing a national framework for the delivery of policing to Indigenous communities. The Program—which scholars have called Canada's first "comprehensive national policing strategy for its Aboriginal peoples"—was designed to allow First Nations and Inuit communities to establish their own police forces that met the provincial standards for non-Indigenous police services, or establish their own RCMP detachment staffed by Indigenous officers. However, the program has been criticized as underfunded and discriminatory by Indigenous groups, police chiefs, and the Canadian Human Rights Tribunal.

In 1993, the First Nations Chiefs of Police Association (FNCPA) was created to co-ordinate input from other police forces in dealing with Indigenous policing issues.

In January 2006, two Indigenous men burned to death and an officer was seriously injured in a rescue attempt at a Nishnawbe-Aski Police Service detachment that the police force could not afford to bring into compliance with the fire code.

In 2020, Prime Minister Justin Trudeau promised to review the First Nations and Inuit Policing Program in a throne speech. That review began in 2022, after the Canadian Human Rights Tribunal found that the federal government, which unilaterally sets the budgets for First Nations police forces participating in the First Nations and Inuit Policing Program, engaged in discrimination when it failed to provide adequate funding to the Mashteuiatsh Innu Nation's police force. Later that same year, the British Columbia Special Committee on Reforming the Police Act unanimously recommended that the First Nations and Inuit Policing Program be replaced with a "new legislative and funding framework, consistent with international and domestic policing best practices and standards," and noted that "a truly decolonized lens would see Indigenous police services as an option for neighbouring municipalities or regions."

== List of Indigenous police forces ==
In 2010, there were 38 self-administered First Nation police services in Canada, with one service each in British Columbia, Saskatchewan, and Manitoba; three services in Alberta; nine in Ontario; and 23 in Quebec, although that number had decreased to 22 by 2020.

=== Alberta ===
- Blood Tribe Police Service – Stand Off
- Lakeshore Regional Police – Driftpile
- Tsuu T'ina Nation Police Service – Tsuu T'ina
- Siksika Nation Police Service

=== British Columbia ===
- Stl’atl’imx Tribal Police Service – Lillooet and Mt. Currie

=== Manitoba ===
- Manitoba First Nations Police (formerly Dakota Ojibway Police Service [Dakota Ojibway Tribal Council]) – Portage la Prairie

=== Ontario ===
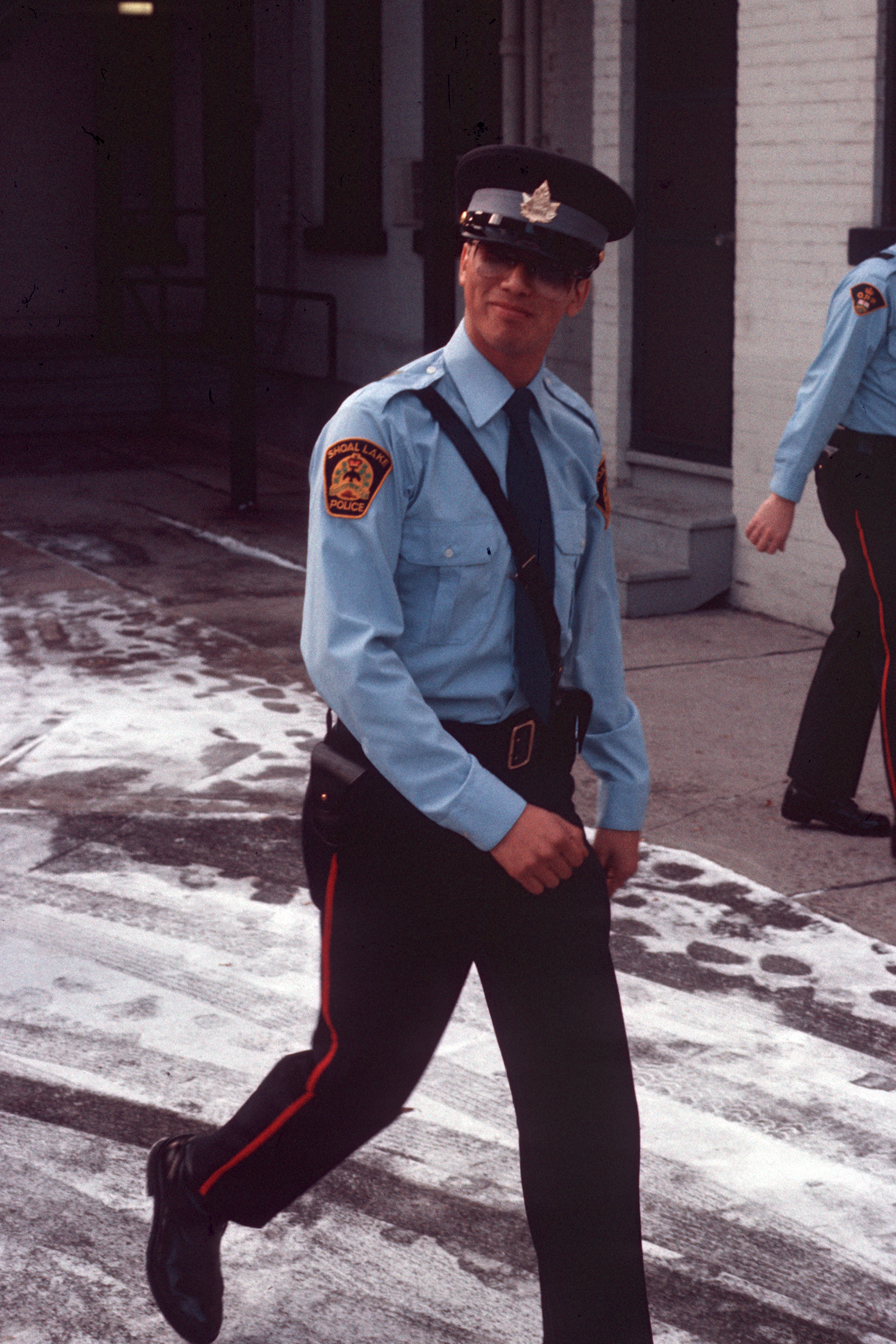
A First Nations constable employed by the Shoal Lake 40 First Nation Police, an OPP-administered First Nations police service. The Shoal Lake Police would later be amalgamated into the self-administered Treaty Three Police Service.

Self-administered First Nations Police Services in Ontario:

- Akwasasne Mohawk Police — Akwesasne
- Anishinabek Police Service — Garden River
- Lac-Seul Police Service — Lac Seul First Nation
- Nishnawbe-Aski Police Service — Thunder Bay
- Rama Police Service — Chippewas of Rama First Nation
- Six Nations Police Service — Ohsweken
- Treaty Three Police Service — Kenora
- UCCM Anishnaabe Police Service — M'Chigeeng First Nation
- Wikwemikong Police Service — Wikwemikong

==== Ontario First Nations Policing Agreement ====
The Ontario Provincial Police administers funding for the Ontario First Nations Policing Agreement (OFNPA) and provides administrative support for First Nations whose choice of policing arrangement under the federal First Nations Policing Program takes one of two forms: an OPP-administered OFNPA option; or OPP policing under a Stream Two Agreement.

- Atikameksheng Anishnawbek (White Fish Lake) Police
- Batchewana First Nation Police
- Bear Island Police
- Neyaashiinigmiing Police (formerly Cape Croker Police)
- Chippewas of the Thames First Nation Police
- Georgina Island Police
- Hiawatha First Nation Police
- Kitchenuhmaykoosib Inninuwug (K.I.) Police (Big Trout Lake)
- Kiashke Zaaging Anishinaabek Police (Gull Bay)
- Lake Helen Reserve Red Rock Band Police
- Mississauga First Nation Police
- Moravian Reserve Police
- Munsee-Delaware Police
- Oneida Police
- Pikangikum Police
- Tyendinaga Police
- Walpole Island First Nations Police

=== Quebec ===
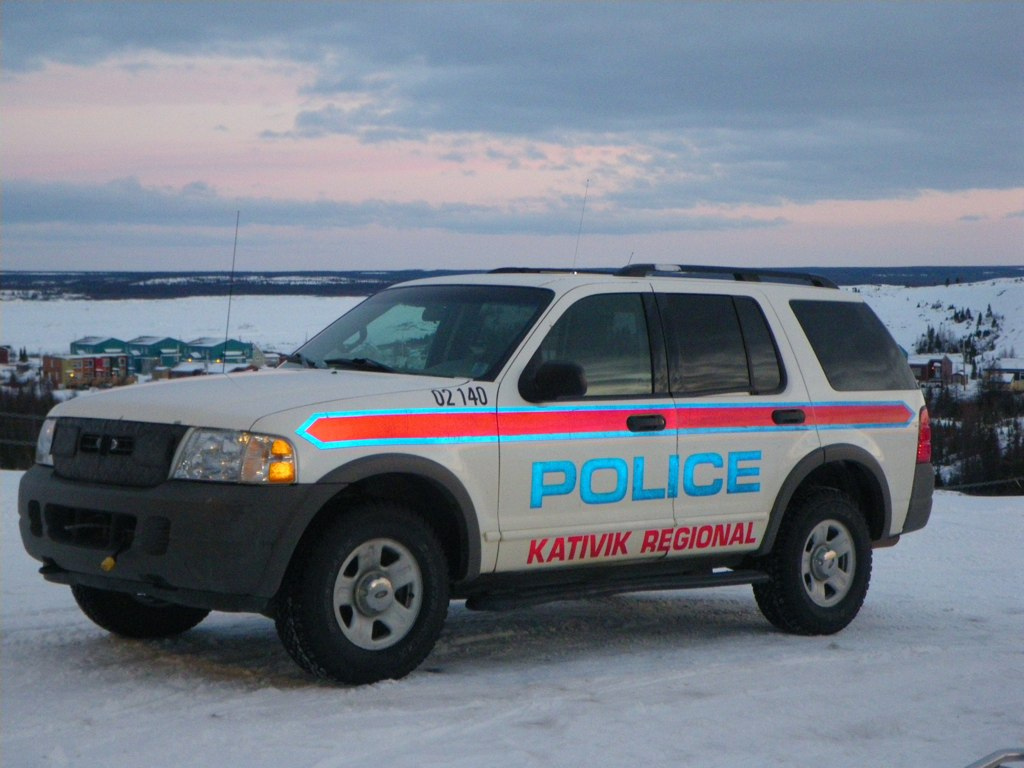
A Kativik Regional Police Force (now the Nunavik Police Service) scout car.

- Cree Police Service, Cree Regional Authority – Montreal
- Eeyou Eenou Police Force — Chisasibi
- Kanesatake Mohawk Police (defunct) — Kanesatake
- Nunavik Police Service – Kuujjuaq
- Long Point Police – Winneway
- Nasakapi Police Force – Kawawachikamach
- Abenaki Police Force — Wolinak and Odanak Reserves
- Kitigan Zibi Police Force - Kitigan Zibi Anishinabeg Reserve

=== Saskatchewan ===
- File Hills First Nations Police Service – Balcarres

== See also ==
- Aboriginal Combined Forces Special Enforcement Unit (A-CFSEU)
