= Gakijiwanong Anishinaabe Nation =

Neguaguon Lake 25D
- Indian reserve
- Neguaguon Lake Indian Reserve No. 25D
- Location within Ontario
- Coordinates: 48°23′N 92°05′W
- Country: Canada
- Province: Ontario
- District: Rainy River
- First Nation: Lac La Croix

Area
  - Land: 62.70 km^{2} (24.21 sq mi)

Population (2021)
  - Total: 118
  - Density: 1.9/km^{2} (4.9/sq mi)
- Website: llcfn.ca

Gakijiwanong Anishinaabe Nation (formerly Lac La Croix First Nation) (Ojibwe: Negwaakwaani-zaaga'igan) is a Saulteaux First Nation band government who reside in the Rainy River District of northwestern Ontario, Canada, along the Ontario-Minnesota border. It is approximately 200 km northwest of Thunder Bay, Ontario. As of January 2008, the First Nation had a registered population of 398 people, of which their on-Reserve population was 273.

== Governance ==
The First Nation elect their officials through the Act Electoral System, consisting of a Chief and four councillors. The current Chief is Carrie Atatise-Norwegian, whose term began in January 2022. The four councillors are Curtis Atatise, Carrie Atatise-Norwegian, Blair Whitefish and Norman Jordan. Carrie Atatise-Norwegian is Lac La Croix's first female Chief.

As a signatory to Treaty 3, Lac La Croix First Nation is a member of the Pwi-Di-Goo-Zing Ne-Yaa-Zhing Advisory Services, a Regional Chiefs Council, and Grand Council of Treaty 3, a Tribal Political Organization that represents many of First Nation governments in northwestern Ontario and southeastern Manitoba.

== History ==
Seven Generations Education Institute (SGEI) is an Aboriginal-owned and controlled post-secondary institution co-founded by the ten bands in the Rainy Lake Tribal area in 1985. The ten bands are: Big Grassy, Big Island, Couchiching, Lac La Croix, Naicatchewenin, Nigigoonsiminikaaning, Ojibways of Onigaming, Rainy River, Seine River and Mitaanjigaming. Each of the ten bands appointed one member to a board of directors of Seven Generations Education Institute, which functions with the leadership of the executive director.

In 2023, Lac La Croix First Nation changed its name to Gakijiwanong Anishinaabe Nation. 'Gakijiwanong' is Ojibwe for "Where the water flows".

== Reserve ==
The First Nation reserved for themselves the 6214.1 ha Neguagon Lake Indian Reserve 25D (formerly known as Lac La Croix Indian Reserve 25D). Originally, the First Nation also had reserved the Sturgeon Lake Indian Reserve 24C but the Ontario Provincial Park Act in 1950 took this second Indian reserve and made it part of Quetico Provincial Park. The Reserve also was home to the last free-roaming population of the Lac La Croix Indian Pony, now an endangered rare breed with preservation efforts supported by the First Nation and other related Ojibwe people.
