= STPS =

STPS may refer to:

- Savonlinnan Työväen Palloseura, a football club
- Standard temperature and pressure, saturated
- Slide Transitions Per Second
- Secretariat of Labor and Social Welfare of Mexico, (in Spanish Secretaría del Trabajo y Previsión Social)
- Stl’atl’imx Tribal Police Service
