= Sabaskong Bay 35F =

- Indian reserve
- Sabaskong Bay Indian Reserve No. 35F
- Location within Ontario
- Coordinates: 49°08′N 94°04′W
- Country: Canada
- Province: Ontario
- District: Kenora, Rainy River
- First Nation: Ojibways of Onigaming

Area
  - Land: 5.18 km^{2} (2.00 sq mi)

Sabaskong Bay 35F is a First Nations reserve on Lake of the Woods, straddling the border of Kenora District and Rainy River District in Ontario, Canada. It is one of the reserves of the Ojibways of Onigaming First Nation.
