= Couchiching 16A =

- Indian reserve
- Couchiching Indian Reserve No. 16A
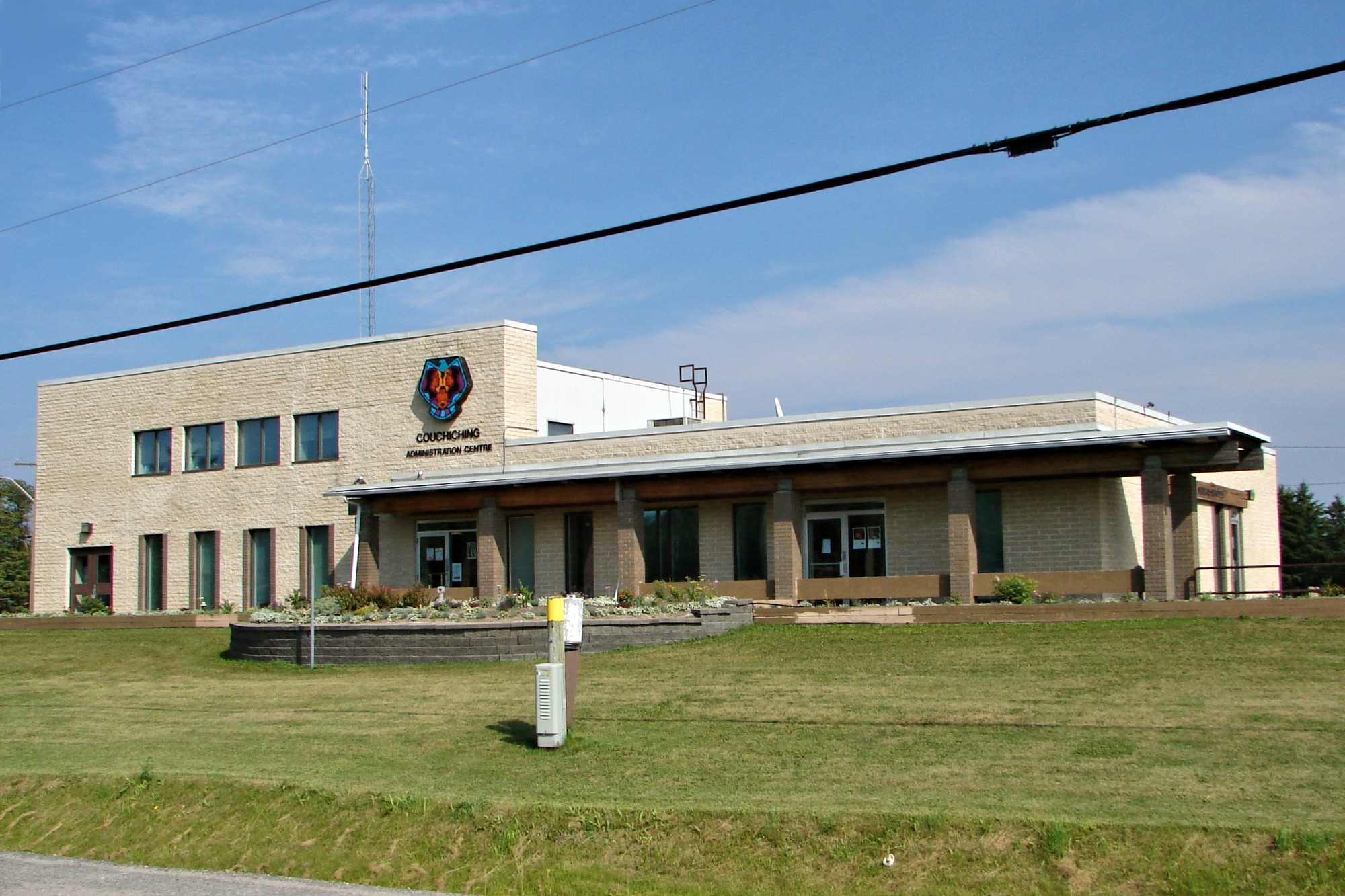

- Location within Ontario
- Coordinates: 48°41′N 93°26′W
- Country: Canada
- Province: Ontario
- District: Rainy River
- First Nation: Couchiching

Area
  - Land: 65.47 km^{2} (25.28 sq mi)

Population (2021)
  - Total: 633
  - Density: 9.7/km^{2} (25/sq mi)
- Website: www.couchiching firstnation.com

Couchiching 16A is a First Nations reserve near Fort Frances, Ontario. It is the main reserve of the Couchiching First Nation.
