= Wabigoon Lake Ojibway Nation =

Wabigoon Lake 27
- Indian reserve
- Wabigoon Lake Indian Reserve No. 27
- Location within Ontario
- Coordinates: 49°37′N 92°32′W
- Country: Canada
- Province: Ontario
- District: Kenora
- First Nation: Wabigoon Lake

Area
  - Land: 46.27 km^{2} (17.86 sq mi)

Population (2011)
  - Total: 184
  - Density: 4/km^{2} (10/sq mi)

Wabigoon Lake Ojibway Nation, commonly known as Wabigoon First Nation (Anishinaabemowin: Waabigoniiw Saaga'iganiiw Anishinaabeg), is a Saulteaux First Nation band government who inhabit the Kenora District in northwestern Ontario, Canada. It is approximately 19 km southeast of Dryden, Ontario. As of January 2008, the First Nation had a registered population of 533 people, of which their on-Reserve population was 175.

== History ==
The Wabigoon Lake reserve was first laid out in 1884 and was confirmed by the Ontario government in 1915. Members of the Wabigoon Band of Saulteaux living on the western portion of the Indian reserve moved away and formed the Eagle Lake First Nation. Those living on the eastern portion of the Reserve officially changed its name to Wabigoon Lake Ojibway Nation on August 7, 1987.

In 2021, as part of a search for a site for a deep geological repository for Canada's used nuclear fuel, the Nuclear Waste Management Organization (NWMO) drilled boreholes in a rock formation known as the Revell Batholith, located south of Highway 17, about 35 kilometres west of Ignace (between Ignace and Wabigoon Lake Ojibway Nation).

On November 28, 2024, the NWMO selected Wabigoon Lake Ojibway Nation and the township of Ignace as the site of a nuclear waste repository. Construction is expected to begin in the mid 2030s and become operational in the early 2040s.

== Governance ==
The First Nation elect their officials through the Act Electoral System, consisting of a Chief and four councillors. The current Chief is Clayton Wetelainen, the four councillors are Laurel Spalding, Ron Williams, Tyson Williams, and forth coming via bi-election in January 2022.

As a signatory to Treaty 3, Wabigoon Lake Ojibway Nation is a member of the Bimose Tribal Council, a Regional Chiefs Council, and Grand Council of Treaty 3, a Tribal Political Organization that represents many of First Nation governments in northwestern Ontario and southeastern Manitoba.

== Reserve ==
The First Nation have reserved for themselves the 5,209.2 hectares (12,872 acres) Wabigoon Lake 27 Indian reserve.
