= Nigigoonsiminikaaning First Nation =

First Nations tribe located in Ontario

Coordinates: 48°44′17″N 92°55′19″W

Nigigoonsiminikaaning First Nation, formerly known as the Nicickousemenecaning First Nation and as the Red Gut First Nation, is a Saulteaux First Nation band government who inhabit the banks of Rainy Lake of the Rainy River District in Northwestern Ontario, Canada. As of January, 2008, the First Nation had a population of 290 registered people. As of 2017, it has approximately 130 on-reserve members.

== Name ==
The name Nigigoonsiminikaaning can mean "Place abundant with little otters" but the intended meaning is "Place abundant with Little-Otter berries"—nigigoonsimin (Little-Otter berry) being the Ojibwe word for sand cherry (Prunus pumila). Due to the First Nation's main reserve Rainy Lake 26A located on Red Gut Bay of Rainy Lake, Nigigoonsiminikaaning was also known as the "Red Gut Band" and later as "Red Gut First Nation".

== Governance ==
The First Nation have an electoral system of government, consisting of a Chief and three Councillors forming their council. Chief Will Windigo, and Councillors Don Jones, Clayton Windigo and Sue Boshey are serving their two-year term that began on in June 2014.

The First Nation is a member of the Pwi-Di-Goo-Zing Ne-Yaa-Zhing Advisory Services, a regional Chiefs Council, which in turn is a member of the Grand Council of Treaty 3, a Tribal Political Organization serving many of the First Nations in northwest Ontario and southeast Manitoba.

== History ==
Seven Generations Education Institute (SGEI) is an Aboriginal-owned and controlled post-secondary institution co-founded by the ten bands in the Rainy Lake Tribal area in 1985. The ten bands are: Big Grassy, Big Island, Couchiching, Lac La Croix, Naicatchewenin, Nicickousemenecaning, Ojibways of Onigaming, Rainy River, Seine River and Mitaanjigaming. Each of the ten bands appointed one member to a board of directors of Seven Generations Education Institute, which functions with the leadership of the executive director.

=== Services ===
The community has its own voluntary and paid positions in their community organizations, including a volunteer fire department, First Responder team, Recreation, Education, Housing and Economic Development committees. The Band Administration services the community in the areas of community health, education, social services, housing and economic development. In addition, the First Nation has also made arrangements with the University of Minnesota in Minneapolis to set up seasonal language camps at the mouth of the Ottertail River.

=== Reserves ===
The First Nation have reserved themselves four Indian reserves:

- 1,909.7 hectares (4,719 acres) Rainy Lake 26A, which serves as their main reserve,
- 1,068.4 hectares (2,640 acres) Rainy Lake 26B,
- 1,107.6 hectares (2,737 acres) Rainy Lake 26C and
- 14 hectares (35 acres) Agency 1, which is shared with three other First Nations.
