= Seine River 23A =

Seine River 23A Ashkibwaanikaang
- Indian reserve
- Seine River Indian Reserve No. 23A
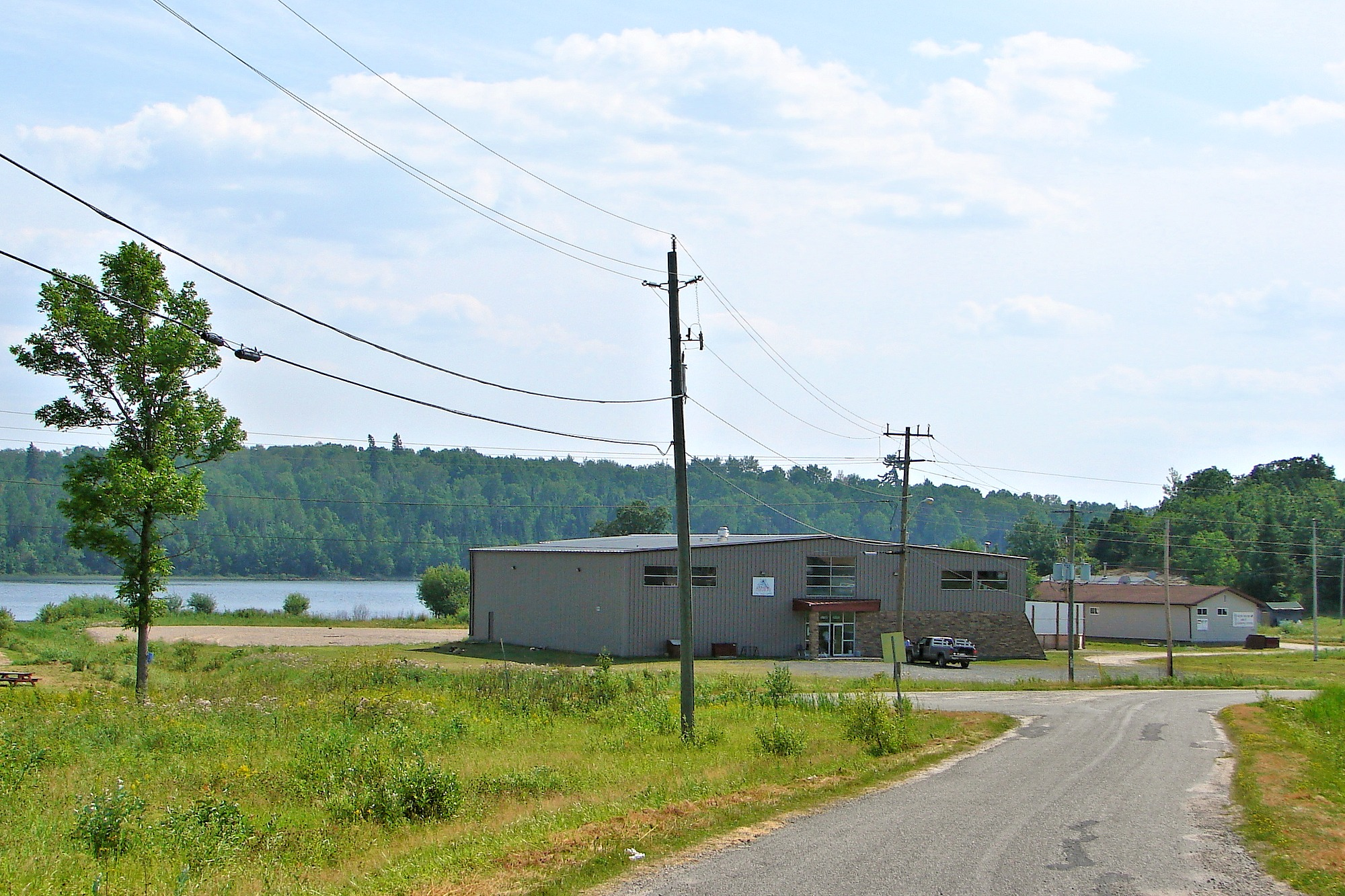

- Location within Ontario
- Coordinates: 48°43′N 92°25′W
- Country: Canada
- Province: Ontario
- District: Rainy River
- First Nation: Seine River

Area
  - Land: 15.72 km^{2} (6.07 sq mi)

Population (2021)
  - Total: 270
  - Density: 17.2/km^{2} (45/sq mi)
- Website: seineriverfirstnation.ca

Seine River 23A is a First Nations reserve in northwestern Ontario, Canada. It is one of three reserves of the Seine River First Nation.
