= Naongashing 35A =

- Indian reserve
- Naongashing Indian Reserve No. 35A
- Location within Ontario
- Coordinates: 49°15′N 94°30′W
- Country: Canada
- Province: Ontario
- District: Kenora
- First Nation: Big Grassy

Area
  - Land: 5.18 km^{2} (2.00 sq mi)

Naongashing 35A is a First Nations reserve on Aulneau Island in Lake of the Woods in Ontario. It is one of the reserves of the Big Grassy First Nation.
