= Sturgeon Falls 23 =

- Indian reserve
- Sturgeon Falls Indian Reserve No. 23
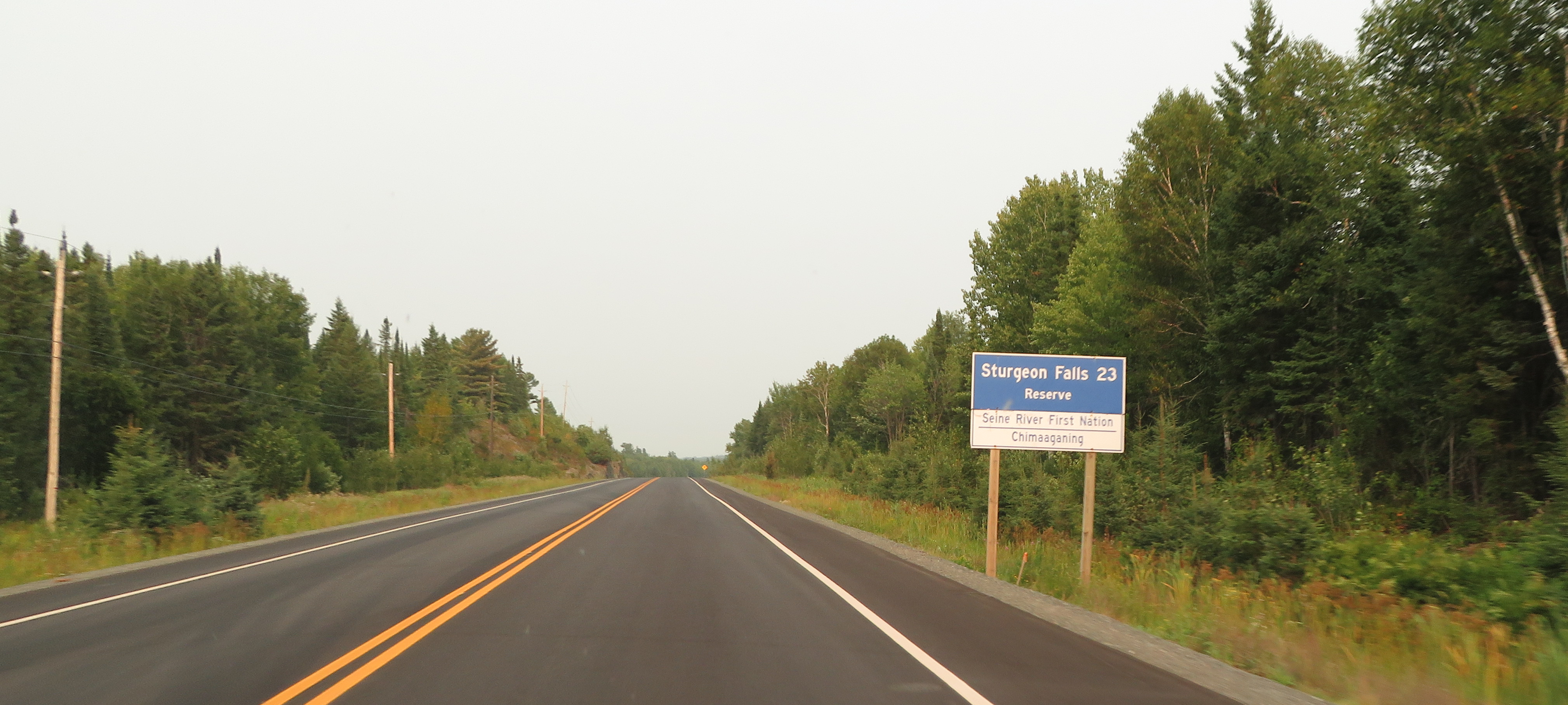

- Location within Ontario
- Coordinates: 48°45′N 92°21′W
- Country: Canada
- Province: Ontario
- District: Rainy River
- First Nation: Seine River

Area
  - Land: 26.43 km^{2} (10.20 sq mi)

Population (2021)
  - Total: 10
  - Density: 0.4/km^{2} (1.0/sq mi)

Sturgeon Falls 23 is a First Nations reserve in Rainy River District, Ontario, Canada. It is one of the reserves of the Seine River First Nation.
