= Obabikong 35B =

- Indian reserve
- Obabikong Indian Reserve No. 35B
- Location within Ontario
- Coordinates: 49°15′N 94°15′W
- Country: Canada
- Province: Ontario
- District: Kenora
- First Nation: Big Grassy

Area
  - Land: 7.12 km^{2} (2.75 sq mi)

Obabikong 35B is a First Nations reserve on Aulneau Island in Lake of the Woods, Ontario. It is one of the reserves of the Big Grassy First Nation.
