= Rainy Lake 26B =

- Indian reserve
- Rainy Lake Indian Reserve No. 26B
- Location within Ontario
- Coordinates: 48°50′N 92°57′W
- Country: Canada
- Province: Ontario
- District: Rainy River
- First Nation: Nigigoonsiminikaaning

Area
  - Land: 10.68 km^{2} (4.12 sq mi)

Rainy Lake 26B is a First Nations reserve in Rainy River District, Ontario, Canada. It is one of the reserves of the Nigigoonsiminikaaning First Nation.
