= Sabaskong Bay 35C =

- Indian reserve
- Sabaskong Bay Indian Reserve No. 35C
- Location within Ontario
- Coordinates: 49°12′N 94°05′W
- Country: Canada
- Province: Ontario
- Districts: Kenora, Rainy River
- First Nation: Ojibways of Onigaming

Area
  - Land: 8.33 km^{2} (3.22 sq mi)

Population (2011)
  - Total: 0
  - Density: 0/km^{2} (0/sq mi)

Sabaskong Bay 35C is a First Nations reserve on Lake of the Woods in northwestern Ontario, Canada. It is one of the reserves of the Ojibways of Onigaming First Nation.
