= Northwest Angle 33B =

- Indian reserve
- Northwest Angle Indian Reserve No. 33B
- Location within Ontario
- Coordinates: 49°23′N 95°01′W
- Country: Canada
- Province: Ontario
- District: Kenora
- First Nation: Northwest Angle 33

Area
  - Land: 12.78 km^{2} (4.93 sq mi)

Population (2011)
  - Total: 86
  - Density: 6.7/km^{2} (17/sq mi)

Northwest Angle 33B is a First Nations reserve in Kenora District, Ontario. It is one of three reserves for the Northwest Angle 33 First Nation.
