= Susan Blight =

First Nations artist, filmmaker and educator from Canada

Doctor (title) Susan Blight
- Citizenship: Couchiching First Nation and Canadian
- Education: University of Windsor; University of Manitoba; University of Toronto
- Known for: Filmmaker, activist, arts educator
- Website: www.susanblight.com

Susan Blight is an Anishinaabe visual artist, filmmaker, and arts educator from Couchiching First Nation. Her work, especially her public art throughout the city of Toronto, Ontario, often explores themes of "personal and cultural identity and its relationship to space". In 2016, the City of Toronto placed several street signs with Anishinaabe names throughout a neighborhood as a response to the Ogimaa Mikana Project co-founded by Blight.

== Education ==
Blight holds a Master of Fine Arts in Integrated Media from the University of Windsor, and a Bachelor of Fine Arts in Photography and a Bachelor of Fine Arts in Film studies from the University of Manitoba. She holds a PhD in Social Justice Education from the Ontario Institute for Studies in Education.

== Career ==
Blight's interdisciplinary work includes projects that combine public art and Anishinaabe culture, language, and history. In 2008, Susan Blight was featured in a group photograph exhibition at the Gallery 44 Centre for Contemporary Photography.

During the early 2010s, Blight co-hosted a radio show, Indigenous Waves.

In 2013, Blight and colleague Hayden King co-founded the Ogimaa Mikana Project, an artist collective that reclaims Indigenous place names for Toronto's streets by posting billboards with Anishinaabemowin phrases around the city and pasting stickers with Anishinaabemowin names on street signs. She described one billboard in Parkdale, Toronto, as "reminding people of the 15,000 year [indigenous] history here in Toronto and to affirm our relationship to our language, which is part of our spiritual presence, our political presence, our governance, our health..." in response to the neighborhood's rapid gentrification and loss of its indigenous inhabitants. Three years later, the City of Toronto and a local business group collaborated with Ogimaa Mikana to place several official Anishinaabe street signs at the north end of The Annex neighborhood, with Blight and King as advisers. In 2018, Ogimaa Mikana participated in the exhibition Soundings: An exhibition in Five Parts curated by Candice Hopkins and Dylan Robinson. They created an outdoor public installation entitled Never Stuck, a vinyl transfer installed on Mackintosh-Corry Hall at Queen's University main campus.
