= Ojibway Nation of Saugeen =

- Indian reserve
- Ojibway Nation of Saugeen (Savant Lake) Indian Reserve
- Location within Ontario
- Coordinates: 50°27′N 90°42′W
- Country: Canada
- Province: Ontario
- District: Thunder Bay
- First Nation: Ojibways of Saugeen

Area
  - Land: 57.06 km^{2} (22.03 sq mi)

Population (2021)
  - Total: 88
  - Density: 1.5/km^{2} (3.9/sq mi)

The Ojibway Nation of Saugeen is an Ojibwa First Nation in the Canadian province of Ontario. The Nation is located in the Thunder Bay District, approximately 20 kilometres northwest of Savant Lake. In December, 2007, its total registered population was 206, of which the on-reserve population was 72. The community maintains strong ties with Mishkeegogamang First Nation

The Ojibway Nation of Saugeen's landbase consists of a 5,986 ha Ojibway Nation of Saugeen Indian Reserve.

== Governance ==
Saugeen is governed by Chief John Machimity and three councillors: Kenneth Rogers, Harley Machimity and Melony Necan. Though not a signatory to Treaty 3, Saugeen is a member of the Grand Council of Treaty 3. At one time Saugeen was member of the Windigo First Nations Council and the Nishnawbe Aski Nation, but withdrew from their memberships in 1995. Ever since, the council has been a politically independent First Nation.
