= Long Sault 12 =

- Indian reserve
- Long Sault Indian Reserve No. 12
- Location within Ontario
- Coordinates: 48°39′N 94°07′W
- Country: Canada
- Province: Ontario
- District: Rainy River
- First Nation: Rainy River

Area
  - Land: 48.16 km^{2} (18.59 sq mi)

Population (2021)
  - Total: 0
  - Density: 0/km^{2} (0/sq mi)
- Website: www.rainyrverfirstnations.com

Long Sault 12 is a First Nations reserve in northwestern Ontario, Canada. It is one of the reserves of the Rainy River First Nations.
