= Whitefish Bay 33A =

- Indian reserve
- Whitefish Bay Indian Reserve No. 33A
- Location within Ontario
- Coordinates: 49°22′N 93°57′W
- Country: Canada
- Province: Ontario
- District: Kenora
- First Nation: Northwest Angle 33

Area
  - Land: 12.89 km^{2} (4.98 sq mi)

Population (2011)
  - Total: 79
  - Density: 6.1/km^{2} (16/sq mi)

Whitefish Bay 33A is a First Nations reserve on Lake of the Woods near Sioux Narrows-Nestor Falls in northwestern Ontario. It is one of three reserves of the Northwest Angle 33 First Nation.
