= Al Hunter (writer) =

Canadian Anishinaabe writer

Al Hunter is an Anishinaabe writer who has published poetry in books and journals, taught extensively, and performed internationally. A member of Rainy River First Nations and former chief, Hunter has expertise in land claims negotiations, and is a longstanding activist on behalf of indigenous rights and wellness, and environmental responsibility.

Hunter lives in Manitou Rapids, Rainy River First Nations in Ontario, Canada. His poetry has been widely published, including such anthologies and journals as: Boyhood, Growing Up Male: A Multicultural Anthology; Canadian Literature; Gatherings; New Breed; North Coast Review; Poets Who Haven't Moved to Minneapolis; Rampike; as well as the anthology, Days of Obsidian, Days of Grace, Poetry and Prose by Four Native American Writers.

Hunter was named an Anishinaabe Achiever of the Treaty #3 Nation for his environmental and educational work in 2000. During the summer of that same year, Hunter's wife, Sandra Indian, and he led "A Walk To Remember." They walked for 1200 miles circumnavigating Lake Superior "to bring forth community visions of protecting the air, land and water for the Seven Generations yet to come."

== Books ==
Spirit Horses, Kegedonce Press, 2001

The Recklessness of Love: Bawajiganan Gaye Ni-Maanedam (Dreams and Regrets), Kegedonce Press, 2008

Beautiful Razor: Love Poems & Other Lies, Kegedonce Press, 2011
