= Rainy Lake 26C =

- Indian reserve
- Rainy Lake Indian Reserve No. 26C
- Location within Ontario
- Coordinates: 48°51′N 92°45′W
- Country: Canada
- Province: Ontario
- District: Rainy River
- First Nation: Nigigoonsiminikaaning

Area
  - Land: 11.08 km^{2} (4.28 sq mi)

Rainy Lake 26C is a First Nations reserve in Rainy River District, Ontario, Canada. It is one of the reserves of the Nigigoonsiminikaaning First Nation.
