= First Nations Police (Ontario) =

Jurisdictional structure
- Legal jurisdiction: Aboriginal/Regional

First Nations Police is a collective of Indigenous police forces in Ontario. FNP agencies are responsible for police duties concerning reserves in Ontario. First Nations Constables are appointed by the Commissioner of the Ontario Provincial Police and have the powers of a Police Officer within the province of Ontario for the purpose of carrying out the duties specified in their appointment.

First Nation Police agencies include:

- Six Nations Police - Ohsweken, Ontario
- Wikwemikong Tribal Police - Wikwemikong, Ontario
- Nishnawbe-Aski Police Service - Thunder Bay, Ontario
- Treaty Three Police Service - Kenora, Ontario
- UCCM Anishnaabe Police Service - M'Chigeeng First Nation, Ontario
- Anishinabek Police Service - Garden River, Ontario
- Tyendinaga Mohawk Police - Shannonville, Ontario
- Akwesasne Mohawk Police - Akwesasne, Ontario
- Georgina Island Police - Chippewas of Georgina Island, Ontario
- Walpole Island Police Service - Wallaceburg, Ontario
- Rama Police Service - Chippewas of Rama First Nation, Ontario
- Hiawatha Police Service - Hiawatha First Nation, Ontario

== See also ==
- Indigenous police in Canada
