= Naicatchewenin First Nation =

First Nation in northwest Ontario, Canada

Coordinates: 48°51′00″N 93°34′59″W

Naicatchewenin First Nation, also known as Anishinaabeg of Nagaajiwanaang and formerly known as Northwest Bay First Nation, inhabited a region in Ontario that was cited in the Northwest Angle Treaty of 1873, also known as Treaty 3. Nagaajiwanaang is located approximately 60 kilometres (37 mi) northwest of Fort Frances, with the community of Devlin 50 kilometres (31 mi) to the south on Highway 11. The city of Thunder Bay lies 420 kilometres (260 mi) to the east and Winnipeg is 450 kilometres (280 mi) to the northwest.

== Name ==
In the Ojibwe language, Nagaajiwanaang mean "At the place where the current is obstructed."

== Demographics ==
As of February 2009, the First Nation had a registered population of 375 people, of whom 257 people live within their own Reserve.

== Reserves ==
The Reserves of Nagaajiwanaang include:

- 1,501.80 hectares (3,711.0 acres) Rainy Lake Indian Reserve No. 17A, surveyed in 1878, serves as their main land base, containing the Naicatchewenin Community.
- 987.50 hectares (2,440.2 acres) Rainy Lake Indian Reserve No. 17B
- 14 hectares (35 acres) Agency Indian Reserve No. 1, which is shared with three other First Nations.

== Governance ==
The First Nation elect their leaders for their council under the Indian Act electoral system, consisting of a chief and four councillors. The current council consists of Chief Wayne Smith and Councillors Rhonda Smith, Dean Councillor, Adrian Snowball and Sean Councillor. Their four-year term that began in January 2022.

The First Nation is a member of the Pwi-Di-Goo-Zing Ne-Yaa-Zhing Advisory Services, a regional Chiefs Council, as well as being a member of the Grand Council of Treaty 3, a Tribal Political Organization serving many of the First Nations in northwest Ontario and southeast Manitoba.

== History ==
Seven Generations Education Institute (SGEI) is an Aboriginal-owned and controlled post-secondary institution co-founded by the ten bands in the Rainy Lake Tribal area in 1985. The ten bands are: Big Grassy, Big Island, Couchiching, Lac La Croix, Naicatchewenin, Nigigoonsiminikaaning, Ojibways of Onigaming, Rainy River, Seine River and Mitaanjigaming. Each of the ten bands appointed one member to a board of directors of Seven Generations Education Institute, which functions with the leadership of the executive director.

== Government Programs ==
- Band Administration
- Education
- Health Services
- Brighter Futures
- Building Healthy Communities
- Aboriginal Healing and Wellness
- Social Services
- Family Services
- Housing
- Economic Development
- Post Secondary Education
- Operations and Maintenance
- Naicatchewenin Development Corporation
- Community Services
  - Fire Protection
  - Emergency First Response Team
  - Emergency Preparedness – Community Emergency Control Group
  - Roads and Bridges
  - Central Water Supply
  - Central Sewage System
  - School Bussing
  - Forestry
  - Recreation Services
  - Carpentry
