= Lake of the Woods 35J =

- Indian reserve
- Lake of the Woods Indian Reserve No. 35J
- Location within Ontario
- Coordinates: 49°13′N 94°22′W
- Country: Canada
- Province: Ontario
- District: Kenora
- First Nation: Big Grassy

Area
  - Land: 14.09 km^{2} (5.44 sq mi)

Lake of the Woods 35J is a First Nations reserve in Kenora District, Ontario. It consists of Comegan Island, Sanguishii-aagaamiing Island and Sanguishii-aagaamiising Island in Lake of the Woods, and is one of the reserves of the Big Grassy First Nation.
