= Rainy Lake 26A =

- Indian reserve
- Rainy Lake Indian Reserve No. 26A
- Location within Ontario
- Coordinates: 48°44′N 92°56′W
- Country: Canada
- Province: Ontario
- District: Rainy River
- First Nation: Nigigoonsiminikaaning

Area
  - Land: 24.12 km^{2} (9.31 sq mi)

Population (2021)
  - Total: 158
  - Density: 6.6/km^{2} (17/sq mi)
- Website: nigigoonsiminikaaning.ca

Rainy Lake 26A is a First Nations reserve on Rainy Lake in Rainy River District, Ontario, Canada. It is the main reserve of the Nigigoonsiminikaaning First Nation. The population was 158 in the 2021 census. Languages spoken are given as English and Ojibway in the census.
