= Manitou Rapids 11 =

- Indian reserve
- Manitou Rapids Indian Reserve No. 11
- Location within Ontario
- Coordinates: 48°39′N 93°55′W
- Country: Canada
- Province: Ontario
- District: Rainy River
- First Nation: Rainy River

Area
  - Land: 22.73 km^{2} (8.78 sq mi)

Population (2021)
  - Total: 300
  - Density: 13.2/km^{2} (34/sq mi)

Manitou Rapids 11 is a First Nations reserve in northwestern Ontario, near Chapple. It is one of two reserves of the Rainy River First Nations.
