= Stlʼatlʼimx Tribal Police Service =

- Uniform shoulder patch of the STPS
- Common name: Tribal Police
- Abbreviation: STPS

Agency overview
- Formed: 1992
- Preceding agencies: Tribal Peacekeepers (1988); Stlʼatlʼimx Security (1986)

Jurisdictional structure
- Operations jurisdiction: British Columbia, Canada
- Population: 6,260 approx. (St'at'imc)
- Constituting instrument: BC Police Act
- General nature: Civilian police

Operational structure
- Overseen by: Stlʼatlʼimx Tribal Police Board
- Police Officers: 9
- Elected officer responsible: The Honourable Mike Farnworth, Minister of Public Safety and Solicitor General of British Columbia
- Agency executive: Deborah Doss-Cody, Chief Officer
- Offices: Lillooet, Mount Currie

Website
- stlatlimxpolice.ca

The Stlʼatlʼimx Tribal Police Service (STPS) is the police force for St'at'imc (or Stlʼatlʼimx, /slætˈliːəm/) aboriginal peoples of British Columbia. The STPS is the only aboriginal police service in British Columbia. Their officers are appointed as designated provincial constables, and have full police powers on and off-duty throughout the province. They are based in Lillooet and Mount Currie.

Communities served consist of the N'Quatqua (Anderson Lake), Lil'wat (Mount Currie), Samahquam (Baptiste-Smith), Sekw'el'was (Cayoose Creek), Skatin (Skookumchuck), T'it'q'et (Lillooet), Tsalalh (Seton Lake), Ts'kw'aylaxw (Pavilion), Xa'xtsa (Douglas), and Xaxli'p (Fountain).

== History ==
In 1986 the Lillooet first nation band council established a security program where officers patrolled reserves and worked with the RCMP to prevent and prosecute crime. In 1988 the council built on the security program by forming the peacekeepers for the communities of T'itq'et, Tsalalth, and Lil'wat.

By 1992, the Solicitor General of British Columbia and seven Stlʼatlʼimx communities established a tribal policing project. An agreement with the RCMP formalized a partnership and the RCMP's role as the primary policing authority in the participating communities. In 1999, the BC Police Act was amended to include designated policing agencies. The STPS were re-established under Section 4.1 of the act as a designated policing agency.

== Structure ==
STPS is the only First Nations Administered Police Service (FNAPS) in British Columbia. Modeled on the structure of an independent municipal police department, the department is governed by a police board selected from the communities served. Police officers appointed by the board are either experienced officers or graduates of the Justice Institute of British Columbia, Police Academy.

In 2013, the Stlʼatlʼimx Tribal Police had an authorized strength of 9 police officers.

== See also ==
- Aboriginal police in Canada
- List of law enforcement agencies in British Columbia
- E-Comm
