= Big Grassy First Nation =

Anishinaabe First Nation band government in Ontario, Canada

Coordinates: 49°03′14″N 94°18′25″W

Big Grassy First Nation (Mishkosiminiziibiing Anishinaabeg in the Ojibwe language) is an Ojibwe or Ontario Saulteaux First Nation band government located in Rainy River District, Ontario near Morson, Ontario.

Together with the Ojibways of Onigaming First Nation, Big Grassy First Nation is a successor apparent to the former Assabaska Band of Saulteaux. Its registered population in February, 2012 was 721, of which the on-reserve population was 228. It is a member of the Anishinabeg of Kabapikotawangag Resource Council, a regional tribal council that is a member of the Grand Council of Treaty 3.

== Reserves ==
The First Nation have reserved for themselves six reserves:

- 3,615.10 hectares (8,933.1 acres) Big Grassy River 35G, which serves as their main reserve,
- 1,408.70 hectares (3,481.0 acres) Lake of the Woods 35J,
- 518 hectares (1,280 acres) Naongashing 35A,
- 712.30 hectares (1,760.1 acres) Obabikong 35B,
- 1,098 hectares (2,710 acres) Assabaska, which is shared with Ojibways of Onigaming First Nation, and
- 379 hectares (940 acres) Agency 30, which is shared with 12 other First Nations.

Historically, the Assabaska Band of Saulteaux had also reserved for itself:

- 640 acres (260 ha) Little Grassy River 35E

but it was not surveyed. On paper, two additional reserves were recommended to be set aside to augment Little Grassy River 35E:

- 1,600 acres (650 ha) Little Grassy River 35E1
- 640 acres (260 ha) Windy Point 35E2

but without consultation with the Assabaska Band, all three reserves were disposed upon creation of the Lake of the Woods Provincial Park. Other reserves of the Assabaska Band were parted to the Ojibways of Onigaming First Nation upon dissolution of the Assabaska Band.

== Governance ==
Big Grassy First Nation is governed by Chief Lynn Indian and 5 councillors: Deborah Ludeman, Elvis Adams, Jeff Morison and Glenn Archie. Their elected two-year term ends on January 6, 2021.

== History ==
Seven Generations Education Institute (SGEI) is an Aboriginal-owned and controlled post-secondary institution co-founded by the ten bands in the Rainy Lake Tribal area in 1985. The ten bands are: Big Grassy, Big Island, Couchiching, Lac La Croix, Naicatchewenin, Nigigoonsiminikaaning, Ojibways of Onigaming, Rainy River, Seine River and Mitaanjigaming. Each of the ten bands appoints one member to a board of directors of Seven Generations Education Institute, which works under the leadership of the executive director.
