= Wabauskang First Nation =

Wabauskang 21
- Indian reserve
- Wabauskang Indian Reserve No. 21
- Location within Ontario
- Coordinates: 50°24′N 93°09′W
- Country: Canada
- Province: Ontario
- District: Kenora
- First Nation: Wabauskang

Area
  - Land: 29.98 km^{2} (11.58 sq mi)

Population (2011)
  - Total: 75
  - Density: 2.5/km^{2} (6.5/sq mi)

Wabauskang First Nation is a Saulteaux First Nation in northwestern Ontario, and is a member of the Bimose Tribal Council and the Grand Council of Treaty 3. Their reserve is located at Wabauskang 21.
