= Agency 1 =

- Indian reserve
- Agency Indian Reserve No. 1
- Location within Ontario
- Coordinates: 48°37′27″N 93°21′43″W
- Country: Canada
- Province: Ontario
- District: Rainy River
- First Nations: Couchiching, Mitaanjigamiing, Naicatchewenin & Nigigoonsiminikaaning

Area
  - Land: 0.48 km^{2} (0.19 sq mi)

Population (2021)
  - Total: 0
  - Density: 0/km^{2} (0/sq mi)
- Time zone: UTC-6 (CST)
  - Summer (DST): UTC-5 (CDT)

Agency 1 is a First Nations reserve in the Canadian province of Ontario in the northwest. As of 2021, there is no permanent population. The Indian reserve is shared among four First Nations: Couchiching First Nation, Mitaanjigamiing First Nation, Naicatchewenin First Nation and Nigigoonsiminikaaning First Nation.
