= Ojibways of Onigaming First Nation =

First Nations tribe of Ontario, Canada

Coordinates: 49°10′37″N 93°55′16″W

Ojibways of Onigaming First Nation is an Ojibwe or Ontario Saulteaux First Nation located in Kenora District, Ontario near Nestor Falls, Ontario. Together with the Big Grassy First Nation, Ojibways of Onigaming First Nation is a successor apparent to the former Assabaska Band of Saulteaux. Total registered population in February, 2012, was 737, of which the on-reserve population was 445. The First Nation is a member of the Anishinabeg of Kabapikotawangag Resource Council, a regional tribal council that is a member of the Grand Council of Treaty 3.

== Reserves ==
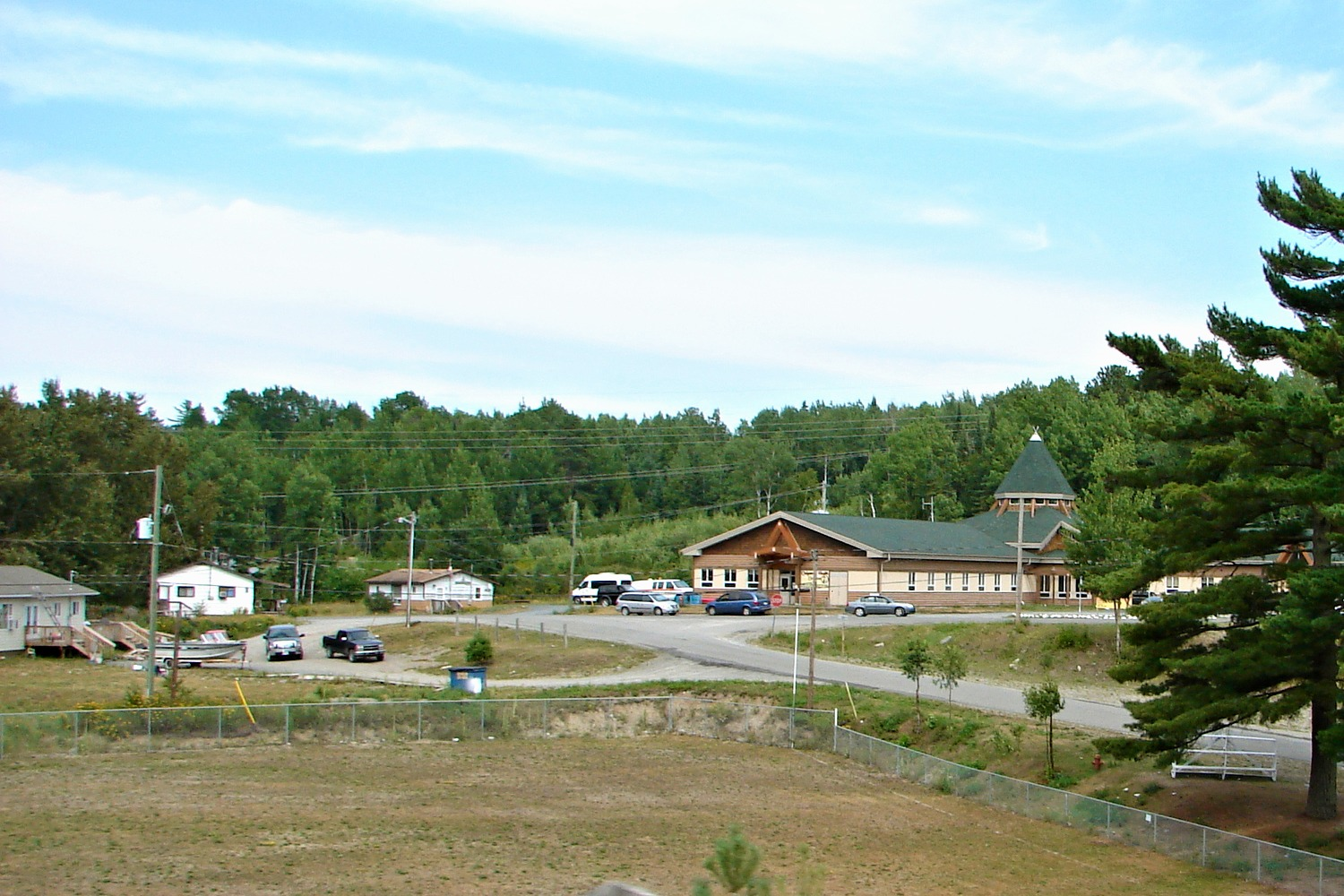
Sabaskong Bay 35D reserve

The First Nation has for itself six reserves:

- 777 hectares (1,920 acres) Sabaskong Bay 35C,
- 504 hectares (1,250 acres) Sabaskong Bay 35D, which serves as their main reserve,
- 518 hectares (1,280 acres) Sabaskong Bay 35F,
- 260 hectares (640 acres) Sabaskong Bay 35H,
- 1,098 hectares (2,710 acres) Assabaska, which is shared with Big Grassy First Nation, and
- 379 hectares (940 acres) Agency 30, which is shared with 12 other First Nations.

== Governance ==
Ojibways of Onigaming First Nation is governed by Chief Jeffrey Copenace and five Councillors: Gus Copenace, Kathy Jack, Shawn Kelly, Kathy Kishiqueb and Clarissa Copenace. Their elected two-year term ends in 2025.

== History ==
Seven Generations Education Institute (SGEI) is an Aboriginal-owned and controlled post-secondary institution co-founded by the ten bands in the Rainy Lake Tribal area in 1985. The ten bands are: Big Grassy, Big Island, Couchiching, Lac La Croix, Naicatchewenin, Nigigoonsiminikaaning, Ojibways of Onigaming, Rainy River, Seine River and Mitaanjigaming. Each of the ten bands appointed one member to a board of directors of Seven Generations Education Institute, which functions with the leadership of the executive director.
