= Northwest Angle 33 First Nation =

First Nation band in Ontario, Canada

Coordinates: 49°22′34″N 95°01′16″W

Northwest Angle 33 First Nation (Ojibwe: Gii-zaagitoowaigamaag) is an Ojibwe or Ontario Anishinaabe First Nation band government who reside in Kenora District, Ontario near Sioux Narrows of Lake of the Woods.

Total registered population in September, 2007, was 438, of which the on-reserve population was 187. The first Nation is a member of the Anishinabeg of Kabapikotawangag Resource Council, a regional tribal council that is a member of the Grand Council of Treaty 3.

== Reserves ==
The First Nation have reserved for themselves three reserves:

- 1,335 hectares (3,300 acres) Northwest Angle Indian Reserve 33B, which serves as their main Reserve, containing the community of Angle Inlet, located across from the Angle Inlet from Angle Inlet, Minnesota.
- 1,251 hectares (3,090 acres) Whitefish Bay Indian Reserve 33A, containing the community of Dog Paw, located near Sioux Narrows
- 379 hectares (940 acres) Agency Indian Reserve 30, which is shared with 12 other First Nations.

== Governance ==
Northwest Angle 33 First Nation is governed by Chief Darlene Ross-Comegan and four Councillors: Diane Sandy, Joseph Katcheconias, Farrell Desrosiers, and Lara Stovern.
