= Eagle Lake First Nation =

Eagle Lake 27
- Indian reserve
- Eagle Lake Indian Reserve No. 27
- Location within Ontario
- Coordinates: 49°44′N 93°02′W
- Country: Canada
- Province: Ontario
- District: Kenora
- First Nation: Eagle Lake

Area
  - Land: 34.40 km^{2} (13.28 sq mi)

Population (2011)
  - Total: 227
  - Density: 6.6/km^{2} (17/sq mi)
- Website: eaglelakefn.ca/

Eagle Lake First Nation (Ojibwe: Migisi Sahgaigan) is an Ojibwe First Nation in northwestern Ontario. It has a reserve named Eagle Lake 27.
