= Couchiching First Nation =

Saulteaux First Nation band government in Ontario

Coordinates: 48°40′55″N 93°24′40″W

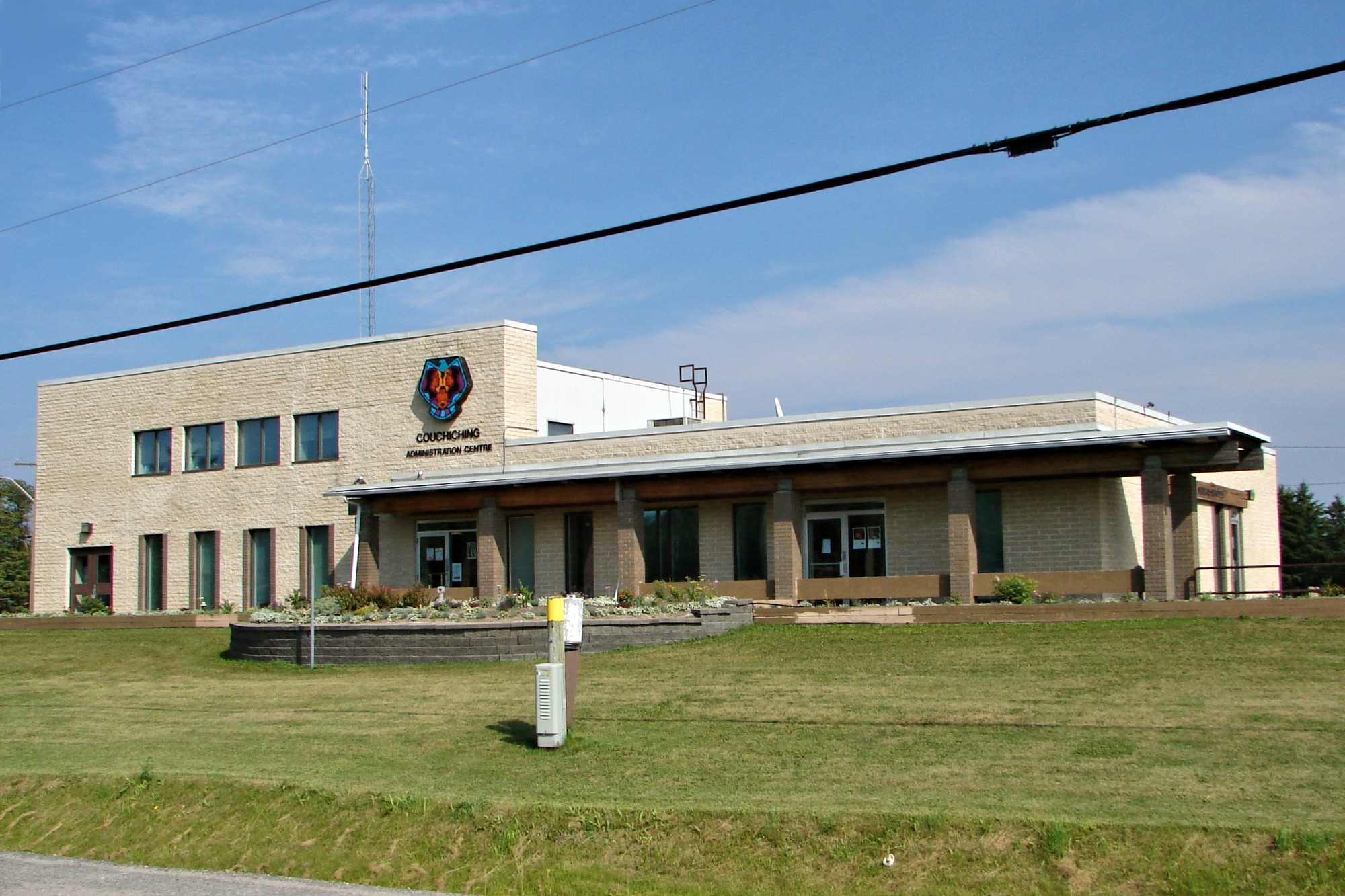
Administration building of the Couchiching First Nation

Couchiching First Nation (Ojibwe: Gojijiing Anishinaabeg) is a Saulteaux First Nation band government in the Canadian province of Ontario, who live on the Couchiching 16A and Agency 1 reserves in the Rainy River District near Fort Frances.

== History ==
The ancestors of Couchiching First Nation were collectively known as Gojijiwininiwag (Couchiching-men) or as Rainy Lake and River Bands of Saulteaux—"couchiching" (gojijiing) being the Ojibwe word for "at the inlet", referring to Rainy Lake, known in Ojibwe as Gojiji-zaaga'igan (Inlet Lake).

Originally, members of Couchiching First Nation resided further west and others were voyageurs from the east until they moved to the Fort Frances area in the late 19th century to avoid the Louis Riel Rebellion. The Department of Indian Affairs then allocated them a tract of land north of the town, but the band members considered it too far from the trading post. Eventually, they ended up on Little Eagle land and changed it to Couchiching.

The current chief is Richard Bruyere. He was elected chief on March 7, 2024, in the band election process. A council of six band members governs the band: Sandy Bruyere (reelected), Lucille Morrisseau (reelected), Randy Jones (reelected), Kourtney Perrault (reelected), Peggy Loyie (reelected), and David Bruyere. The chief's and council's terms end in March 2026.

== Programs ==
Couchiching First Nations administers over a dozen programs within the reserve.

== Wasaw Companies ==
Couchiching First Nation had early residences in the Wasaw area north of Frog Creek/Frog Lake. This area was highly regarded in the busy 19th-century forestry and wild rice harvests. After 1909, flooding impacts and expropriation of land for the railway and highway forced the community to move south of Frog Creek and along Sand Bay (south of Highway 11 east of Fort Frances). The Wasaw companies include Wasaw Business Enterprises, Wasaw Project Inc., Wasaw Construction Ltd., Wasaw Developments, and Wasaw Food Services, Inc. These companies are meant to create own source revenue for the community in order to build an economic base for the community.

Wasaw (waasa) in Ojibwe, the language of Couchiching, means "far".

== Notable people ==
- Susan Blight, visual artist, filmmaker
- Tara Houska, environmental activist, tribal attorney
- Ryan McMahon, comedian, writer
