= Rainy River First Nations =

Ojibwe First Nation band government in Emo, Ontario, Canada

Coordinates: 48°39′18″N 93°54′25″W

Rainy River First Nations (Ojibwe: Manitoo-baawidigoong) is an Ojibwe First Nation band government in Emo, Ontario, Canada.

== History ==
The First Nation is an amalgamation of seven historical Rainy River Saulteaux bands. Six of them either sold or transferred their Reserves in 1914-1915 and then began the amalgamation into a single Band. The Canadian federal government made the amalgamation official in the 1960s. The seven historical Saulteaux bands forming the Rainy River First Nations (and their historical reserves) are:

- Hungry Hall 1 Band of Rainy River Saulteaux — Hungry Hall (Bishop) 14
- Hungry Hall 2 Band of Rainy River Saulteaux — Hungry Hall (Paskonkin) 15
- Little Forks Band of Rainy River Saulteaux (part) — Little Forks 10
- Long Sault 1 Band of Rainy River Saulteaux — Long Sault 12
- Long Sault 2 Band of Rainy River Saulteaux — Long Sault 13
- Manitou Rapids 1 Band of Rainy River Saulteaux — Manitou Rapids 11
- Manitou Rapids 2 Band of Rainy River Saulteaux — Manitou Rapids 11

== Governance ==
The First Nation have an electoral system of government, consisting of a Chief and five councillors forming their council. Chief Robin McGinnis, and Councillors Marcel Horton, Shawn Brown, Garry Medicine, Kathy Bombay, and Will McGinnis are serving their two-year term that began in October, 2017.

The First Nation is a member of the Pwi-Di-Goo-Zing Ne-Yaa-Zhing Advisory Services, a regional Chiefs Council, which in turn is a member of the Grand Council of Treaty 3, a Tribal Political Organization serving many of the First Nations in northwest Ontario and southeast Manitoba.

== Reserve ==
The First Nation have reserved for itself two Indian reserve tracts:

- 3 hectares (7.4 acres) Long Sault 12
- 2,267.1 hectares (5,602 acres) Manitou Rapids 11

With the "Rainy River First Nations Land Settlement Agreement", some of the former reserves and other lands within the First Nation's Customary Use Area lands are made available to have either additional lands set in Reserve or have the Crown oversee in Trust the land for the benefit of the First Nation.

== Notable members ==
- Al Hunter, poet
