= Mitaanjigamiing First Nation =

Coordinates: 48°42′47″N 93°21′40″W

Mitaanjigamiing First Nation, formerly known as Stanjikoming First Nation, is an Ojibwe First Nation band government who inhabit 16 kilometres (9.9 mi) north of Fort Frances, Ontario, along the shores of Stanjikoming Bay of Rainy Lake. As of November, 2011, the First Nation had a total registered population of 142, of which 99 lived on their own reserve.

== Governance ==
The First Nation have a custom electoral system of government, consisting of a Chief and two councillors forming their council. Chief Madeline Henderson, and Councillors Christopher Henderson and Pamela Johnson began their appointment on March 26, 2013.

The First Nation is a member of the Pwi-Di-Goo-Zing Ne-Yaa-Zhing Advisory Services, a regional Chiefs Council, which in turn is a member of the Grand Council of Treaty 3, a Tribal Political Organization serving many of the First Nations in northwest Ontario and southeast Manitoba.

== Reserve ==
The First Nation have reserved for itself two Indian reserve tracts:

- 1,562.60 hectares (3,861.3 acres) Rainy Lake 18C, which serves as their main reserve
- 14 hectares (35 acres) Agency 1, which is shared with three other First Nations
