= Anishinaabe tribal political organizations =

Anishinaabe tribal political organizations are political consortiums (like tribal councils) of Anishinaabe nations that advocate for the political interests of their constituencies. Anishinaabe people of Canada are considered as First Nations, and of the United States as Native Americans.

== List of Anishinaabe tribal political organizations ==
- Anishinabek Nation (also known as Union of Ontario Indians)
- Assembly of Manitoba Chiefs
- Association of Iroquois and Allied Indians
- Chiefs of Ontario — represents Anishinaabek, Swampy Cree, and Lenape Peoples in Ontario
- Grand Council of Treaty 3
- Great Lakes Inter-Tribal Council — federally-recognized tribes in Wisconsin and the Upper Peninsula of Michigan
  - Bad River Band of Lake Superior Chippewa
  - Forest County Potawatomi
  - Ho-Chunk Nation
  - Lac Courte Oreilles Band of Lake Superior Chippewa
  - Lac du Flambeau Band of Lake Superior Chippewa
  - Lac Vieux Desert Tribe of Michigan
  - Menominee Tribe of Wisconsin
  - Oneida Nation
  - Red Cliff Band of Lake Superior Chippewa
  - Sokaogon Chippewa (Mole Lake)
  - St. Croix Chippewa Indians of Wisconsin
  - Stockbridge–Munsee Indians of Wisconsin
- Inter-Tribal Council of Michigan
  - Bay Mills Indian Community
  - Grand Traverse Band of Ottawa and Chippewa Indians
  - Hannahville Indian Community
  - Keweenaw Bay Indian Community
  - Lac Vieux Desert Band of Lake Superior Chippewa
  - Little Traverse Bay Bands of Odawa Indians
  - Match-E-Be-Nash-She-Wish Band of Pottawatomi
  - Nottawaseppi Huron Band of Potawatomi
  - Pokagon Band of Potawatomi
  - Saginaw Chippewa Tribal Council
  - Sault Tribe of Chippewa Indians
- Minnesota Indian Affairs Council — representing several Anishinaabe (Chippewa) and Dakota communities of Minnesota
  - Lower Sioux Indian Community
  - Minnesota Chippewa Tribe
  - Prairie Island Indian Community
  - Red Lake Band of Chippewa
  - Shakopee Mdewakanton Sioux Community
  - Upper Sioux Community (Pejuhutazizi Oyate)
- Nishnawbe Aski Nation (formerly known as Grand Council Treaty 9)
  - Independent First Nations Alliance
  - Keewaytinook Okimakanak Council
  - Matawa First Nations
  - Mushkegowuk Council
  - Shibogama First Nations Council
  - Wabun Tribal Council
  - Windigo First Nations Council
- Southern Chiefs' Organization Inc. — represents Anishinaabe and Dakota Nations in southern Manitoba
- Treaty 8 First Nations of Alberta (formerly Grand Council of Treaty 8) — represents Treaty 8 signatories in Alberta
- Treaty 8 Tribal Association — represents Treaty 8 signatories in British Columbia

== Tribal Treaty Administrants ==
In Canada, Tribal Political Organization takes the role of the Tribal Treaty Administrant. However, in the United States, the function of Tribal Treaty Administrant is separate from that of the Tribal Political Organization.

- 1854 Treaty Authority (formerly, the Tri-Band Authority)
  - Grand Portage fisheries of 1842 Treaty-ceded territory
  - 1854 Treaty-ceded territory (co-managed with the Great Lakes Indian Fish & Wildlife Commission)
  - Cultural resources of 1866 Treaty of Washington-ceded territory (Bois Forte Band of Chippewa)
- Chippewa Ottawa Resource Authority — 1836 Treaty-ceded territory (co-managed with the Great Lakes Indian Fish & Wildlife Commission)
- Grand Council of Treaty 3 — Treaty 3
- Great Lakes Indian Fish & Wildlife Commission
  - 1836 Treaty-ceded Territory (co-managed with the Chippewa Ottawa Resource Authority)
  - 1837 Treaty-ceded Territory
  - 1842 Treaty-ceded Territory
  - 1854 Treaty-ceded Territory (co-managed with the 1854 Treaty Authority)
- Nishnawbe Aski Nation — Treaty 9 in Northern Ontario
- Red Lake Band of Chippewa
  - 1863 Treaty of Old Crossing-ceded territory
  - 1864 Treaty of Old Crossing-ceded territory
  - Nelson Act of 1889 territory
  - 1902 Land Agreement-ceded territory
- Treaty 8 First Nations of Alberta (formerly Grand Council of Treaty 8) — Treaty 8 in Alberta
- Treaty 8 Tribal Association — Treaty 8 in British Columbia
- Union of Ontario Indians — RS, RH1, RH2, misc. pre-confederation treaties
