= Anishinaabe Giizhigad =

First Nations of Ontario national holiday

- Also called: Anishinaabe Day ᐊᓂᔑᓈᐯ ᑮᔑᑲᐟ ᐊᓂᔑᓈᐯ ᑮᔑᑲᑦ
- Observed by: Anishinabek Nation
- Type: National
- Significance: New Year
- Date: 6 June
- Frequency: Annual

Inaugurated in 2022, Anishinaabe Day or Anishinaabe Giizhigad (ᐊᓂᔑᓈᐯ ᑮᔑᑲᐟ; ᐊᓂᔑᓈᐯ ᑮᔑᑲᑦ) is the national holiday for the Anishinabek Nation. It is celebrated by the approximately 65,000 citizens hailing from the union of 39 First Nations in Ontario as a reflection of the proclamation of the Nation's constitution on 6 June 2012.

== Etymology ==
Anishinaabe Giizhigad is the Anishinaabemowin translation of "Anishinaabe Day." "Anishinaabe" means "person" or a "Native person (in contrast to non-Native)." Transcribed into syllabics, it becomes "ᐊᓂᔑᓈᐯ ᑮᔑᑲᐟ" in the North and "ᐊᓂᔑᓈᐯ ᑮᔑᑲᑦ" in the East.

== Significance ==
Originally organized as, first, the Grand General Indian Council of Ontario and Quebec and, later, as the Union of Ontario Indians, the Anishinabek Nation represents 39 First Nations in a confederation that traces its roots back to the Council of Three Fires. Following years of work, the Anishinabek Nation Grand Council ratified, by Grand Council Resolution, the Anishinabek National Constitution (the Anishinaabe Chi-Naaknigewin), which was then confirmed by a Pipe Ceremony held in the Sheguiandah First Nation on June 6, 2012. A year prior, the Chiefs-in-Assembly approved the Anishinaabe Chi-Naaknigewin Preamble, Ngo Dwe Waangizid Anishinaabe (One Anishinaabe Family). As the Nation's head office relates, "The Preamble contains instructions on how to live according to the Laws the Creator has given to the Anishinaabe. Nmishomis Gordon Waindubence sat with an Elders Council to create the Ngo Dwe Waangizid Anishinaabe, which provides the context and the spirit and intent in which the Anishinaabe Chi-Naaknigewin is understood."

The Anishinaabe Chi-Naaknigewin, or Constitution, represents decades of hard work restoring jurisdiction to Anishinabek peoples. The Nation was mandated by the Chiefs-in-Assembly in 1995 through the creation of the Restoration of Jurisdiction Department in order to restore jurisdiction in areas such as governance, education, social services, health, and economic development, amongst others, by establishing and carrying out negotiations with the Governments of Canada and Ontario. The department has been committed to rebuilding traditional governance, and the proclamation and ratification of the Anishinaabe Chi-Naaknigewin follows several other, successful key initiatives like the 2017 Anishinabek Nation Education Agreement and the ongoing Anishinabek Nation Governance Agreement.
