= Anishinabek Police Service =

First Nations police service in Ontario

- Uniform Shoulder Patch of Anishinabek Police Service

Agency overview
- Formed: 1994

Jurisdictional structure
- Operations jurisdiction: Ontario, Canada

Operational structure
- Headquarters: 1436 Highway 17B; Garden River, Ontario
- Sworn members: 109
- Unsworn members: 50
- Elected officer responsible: Michael Kerzner, Solicitor General
- Agency executive: Jeff Skye, Chief of Police

Facilities
- Detachments: 12

Website
- Official website

The Anishinabek Police Service (APS) is the shared police force for 15 of 40 communities in the Anishinabek Nation (formerly "Union of Ontario Indians") and 1 community in the Nishnawbe Aski Nation (NAN).

Created in 1994, the force has approximately 100 sworn officers and 50 civilian members at 12 detachments serving 16 communities.

== History ==
On March 30, 1992, a five-year Ontario First Nations Policing Agreement was signed by Grand Council of Treaty 3, Nishnawbe Aski Nation, Association of Iroquois and Allied Indians, Anishinabek Nation, Six Nations and the Provincial and Federal Government.

In 1994, Garden River, Curve Lake, Sagamok and Saugeen First Nations stepped away from the Ontario Provincial Police (OPP) to form the Anishinabek Police Service. At this time it was also decided that Garden River would be home to Headquarters because geographically it is situated in the center of the province.

== Detachments ==
North Region

- Fort William Detachment
  - Fort William First Nation
- Ginoogaming Detachment
  - Ginoogaming First Nation
- Pic River / Pic Mobert Detachments
  - Ojibways of the Pic River First Nation
  - Netmizaaggamig Nishnaabeg (Pic Mobert)
- Rocky Bay Detachment
  - Biinjitiwaabik Zaaging Anishinaabek

Central Region

- Garden River Detachment
  - Garden River First Nation
- Nipissing / Wahnapitae / Dokis Detachments
  - Dokis First Nation
  - Nipissing First Nation
  - Wahnapitae First Nation
- Sagamok Detachment
  - Sagamok First Nation

South Region

- Christian Island Detachment
  - Beausoleil First Nation
- Curve Lake Detachment
  - Curve Lake First Nation
- Kettle & Stony Point Detachment
  - Chippewas of Kettle and Stony Point First Nation
- Shawanaga / Magnetawan / Wasauksing Detachment
  - Magnetawan First Nation
  - Shawanaga First Nation
  - Wasauksing First Nation
