= WMQT =

Coordinates: 46.502°N 87.648°W

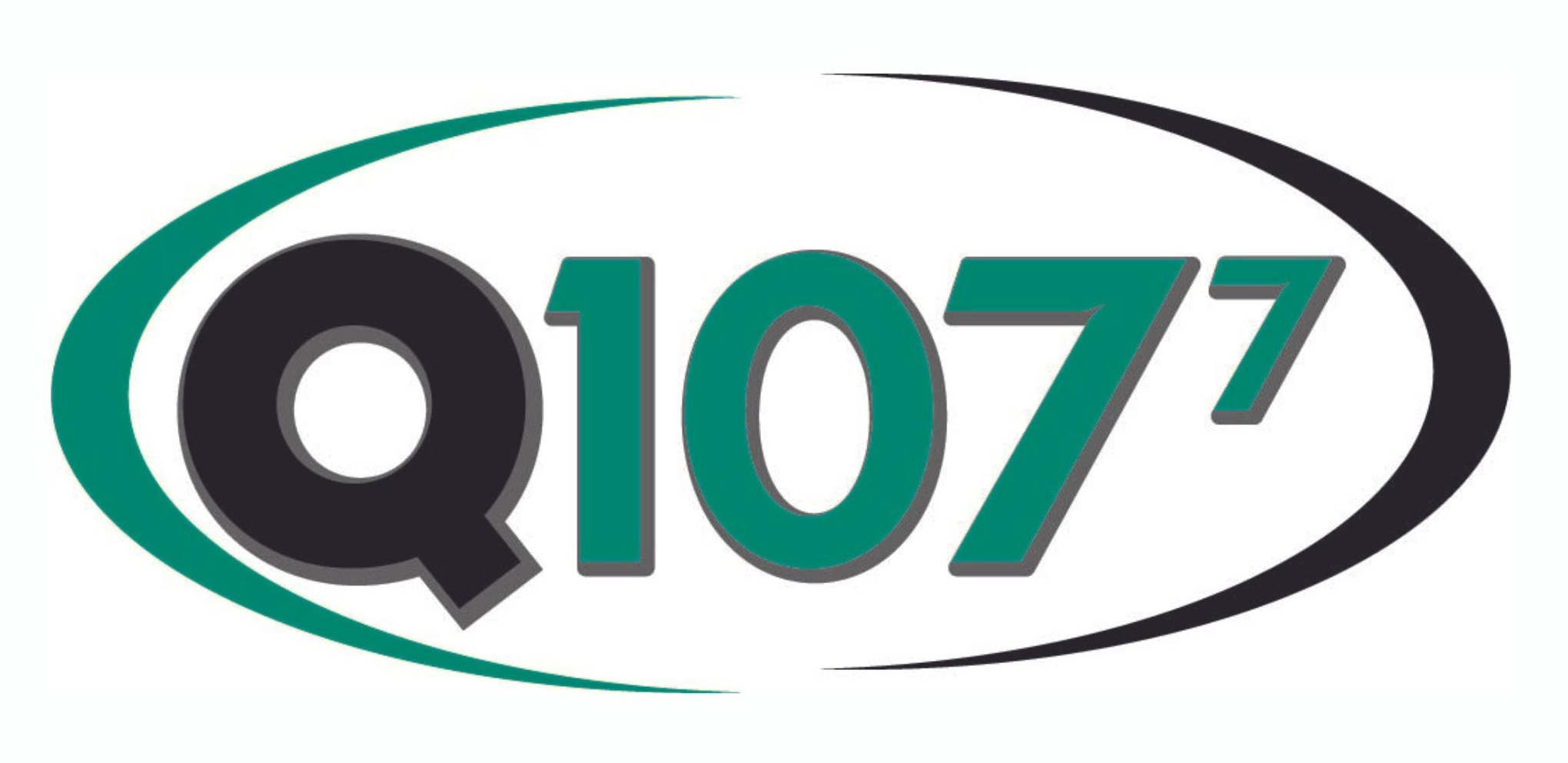
- Ishpeming, Michigan; United States
- Broadcast area: Marquette, Michigan
- Frequency: 107.7 MHz
- Branding: Q107

Programming
- Format: Hot adult contemporary

Ownership
- Owner: Keweenaw Bay Indian Community Native American Tribe
- Sister stations: WCUP, WGLI, WZAM

History
- First air date: January 26, 1974
- Former call signs: WMQT-FM (1974–2014)
- Former frequencies: 107.1 MHz (1974–1985); 107.5 MHz (1985–1995)
- Call sign meaning: Marquette

Technical information
- Licensing authority: FCC
- Facility ID: 64503
- Class: C1
- ERP: 98,000 watts
- HAAT: 194.7 meters (639 ft)
- Translator: 93.3 W227CJ (Marquette)

Links
- Public license information: Public file; LMS
- Website: wmqt.com

WMQT (107.1 FM) is a commercial hot adult contemporary radio station in Marquette, Michigan. The station broadcasts from a transmitter in Ishpeming, Michigan and at 93.3 MHz FM from its translator (W227CJ) in downtown Marquette. The station is owned by the Keweenaw Bay Indian Community Native American Tribe.

The station studio is located in the Pythias Building at 121 N. Front Street in Marquette, Michigan.

== Programming ==
WMQT airs programming in the adult contemporary format. The station includes multiple special schedule events in its programming; most notably "8 from the 80's" and "Friday Favorites" where listeners can cast votes for their favorite of the weekly category chosen by studio staff. The station programming director and afternoon program host is Jim Koski.

== Technical Details ==
The main WQMT transmitter is located at the top of the Malton Road Tower at Morgan Meadows (just south of U.S. Highway 41). The transmitter broadcasts at 98,000 watts effective radiated power (ERP) in an omnidirectional pattern. The main transmitter covers approximately 100 radial miles which includes areas as far south as Iron Mountain, Michigan, as far east as Munising, Michigan, and as far north as Houghton, Michigan.

The main transmitter is positioned on the tower at 555 feet. The tower itself is located at the top of a natural bluff between Ishpeming and Negaunee, Michigan giving it a height above the average local terrain of 639 feet.

The station has a translator holding callsign W227CJ which is located on the Front Street Tower in downtown Marquette, Michigan (directly behind the studio itself). The translator holds a class D license and broadcasts 250 watts effective radiated power in an omnidirectional pattern. The translator was primarily brought online to reinforce reception of the station within the lowest elevation areas of the greater Marquette city. (The main transmitter signal often degrades quickly in these areas due to the unique local geography.)

The translator is positioned on its tower at 141 feet with the tower having been built on the side of a slope towards the north side of Marquette giving it a height above the average local terrain of 583 feet.

== History ==
The station initially went on the air in 1974 at 107.1 MHz FM. The station's original programming format was beautiful music. In 1985, the station's frequency was changed to 107.5 MHz FM and in 1995, the station's frequency changed again to its present 107.7 MHz FM. In the mid-1990's, the station saw a gradual shift of its programming format with a move towards Hot AC and contemporary hit radio.

The station has used the on-air identifier "Q107" since the late 1990s. Prior to the "Q107" identifier, the station was popularly known as "Stereo Rock Q107". (It having been one of the first FM radio stations in the Upper Peninsula of Michigan to adopt and begin transmitting a stereo audio signal.)

WMQT primarily competes with WGLQ (97.1), WUPZ (94.9), WKQS (101.9), and WUPK (94.1) in the central Upper Peninsula market.

WMQT was originally owned by Taconite Broadcasting, Inc. until it was acquired by the Keweenaw Bay Indian Community (KBIC) on February 18, 2022.
