= WZAM =

Radio station in Ishpeming, Michigan

Coordinates: 46°30′20″N 87°32′24″W

Simulcasts WGLI Hancock
- Ishpeming, Michigan; United States
- Broadcast area: Marquette, Michigan
- Frequency: 970 kHz
- Branding: The Rockin' Eagle

Programming
- Format: Active rock
- Affiliations: Detroit Lions Radio Network

Ownership
- Owner: Keweenaw Bay Indian Community Native American Tribe
- Sister stations: WCUP, WGLI, WMQT

History
- First air date: June 26, 1959 (as WJAN)
- Former call signs: WJAN (1959–1965); WCKD (1965–1971); WUPY (1971–1982, 1984–1987); WMVN (1987–1996)

Technical information
- Licensing authority: FCC
- Facility ID: 64504
- Class: D
- Power: 250 watts day 62 watts night
- Translator: 106.9 W295CX (Marquette)

Links
- Public license information: Public file; LMS
- Webcast: Listen Live
- Website: WZAM Online

WZAM (970 AM) is an active rock format radio station licensed to Ishpeming, Michigan, United States.

== History ==
Tri-City Broadcasters, Inc. received a construction permit to build a new radio station in Ishpeming on February 25, 1959, to operate with 5,000 watts during daylight hours only. The station began broadcasting as WJAN on June 26, 1959. Raymond and Joyce Blomquist ran the station until January 22, 1964, when it was foreclosed upon by radio equipment manufacturer Gates Radio Co. and shut down by county sheriffs. The station's CBS Radio affiliation went to WDBC six months later.

A receiver was appointed for the company, and the station was sold out of bankruptcy to Canyon Broadcasters in January 1965. Canyon's owner, Frank Blotter, had become involved with the station right before it folded. Renaming it WCKD, he confronted the task of putting the station back into service. All that remained after Gates's equipment was seized was the antenna structure, requiring almost every necessary piece of equipment to be purchased. It would not be until August 30, 1965, that WCKD signed on the air. Under Canyon, the station continued to struggle as a daytime-only station with a full-time competitor in a small town, losing money. A series of violations over operations after sunset and before sunrise, forbidden for daytime-only radio stations, would end up almost costing Blotter in another business venture. Blotter blamed the confusion on changes that resulted from the Uniform Time Act; the Upper Peninsula moved from year-round Eastern Standard Time to year-round Central Standard Time (CST). However, the license specified operating hours in CST. In 1971, a Federal Communications Commission (FCC) hearing examiner overturned an initial decision favoring his application to build a station in Elmhurst, Illinois. Blotter's station application was ultimately granted when the commission ruled the time zone confusion a misunderstanding and not an "intentional disregard" for regulations.

Taconite Broadcasting acquired the station and changed the call letters to WUPY in 1971. A new talk format was instituted, copying what Taconite's owners—Robert Olson and William Blake—had successfully done at WMPL in Hancock; annual billings soared from $30,000 to $180,000.

By 1994, when Olson sold his stake in Taconite Broadcasting to Blake, WMVN was airing a religious format. This had changed to a simulcast of sister WMQT before WMVN became WZAM with an all-news format from the Associated Press in 1996. Taconite Broadcasting itself would be sold in 2005 to a company of the same name controlled by Thomas Mogush, who already owned 30 percent of the firm but became sole owner after Blake's death. Mogush flipped the station from news to sports using programming from ESPN Radio.

Former logo until April 8, 2016.

A translator was added in 2013 to give WZAM FM coverage for the first time.

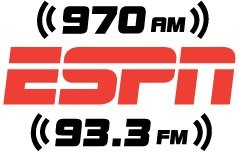
Previous logo

Effective May 31, 2022, Taconite Broadcasting sold WZAM, sister station WMQT, and translators W227CJ and W295CX to the Keweenaw Bay Indian Community Native American Tribe for $400,000.

In late 2022, the station flipped to a rock format, and became known as "The Rockin' Eagle", simulcasting sister station WGLI.
