= Shoulder bag =

Shoulder bag may refer to:

- Anishinaabe Shoulder Bag, associated with Anishinaabe communities of the Great Lakes region
- Handbag, a bag typically used by women to hold personal items
- Messenger bag, a bag worn over one shoulder with a strap that winds around the chest
- A single strap satchel
