= Carol Couchie =

First Nations midwife and health advocate

- Citizenship: Nipissing First Nation and Canada
- Education: Ryerson University
- Occupation: midwife
- Years active: 1998–present

Carol Couchie, RM, is Nishnawbe Kwe and a registered midwife from Nipissing First Nation. She is a member of the first graduating class of Ryerson University's midwifery program in 1998. She is the first Indigenous woman to become a registered midwife in Ontario. She has previously served as chair of the Society of Obstetricians and Gynecologists of Canada's Aboriginal Health Issues Committee. She helped found the Association of Aboriginal Midwives and she helped establish the Aboriginal Midwifery Education Program at the University College of the North. She serves as co-lead of the National Aboriginal Council of Midwives (NACM). She currently practices as a member of K'Tigaaning Midwives, located at Nipissing First Nation.

== Advocacy ==
Couchie, in her role in federal advocacy organizations, has advocated for all federal political parties to support the regulation and provide sustainable funding for midwifery services in all provinces and territories. She has also promoted the benefits of integrating culturally appropriate health practices for Indigenous mothers and then need for equitable prenatal and postnatal support for Indigenous women and women in the remote north.

== Select publications ==
- Pambrun, Nathalie; Lawford, Karen; Couchie, Carol (December 2019). "Indigenous Midwifery in Canada: An Example of Healthy Relationships". Journal of Obstetrics and Gynaecology Canada. 41: S259–S262. doi:10.1016/j.jogc.2019.09.004. PMID 31785669.
- Miller, Katherine J.; Couchie, Carol; Ehman, William; Graves, Lisa; Grzybowski, Stefan; Medves, Jennifer (December 2017). "No 282-Soins de maternité en région rurale" [#282-Rural Maternity Care]. Journal of Obstetrics and Gynaecology Canada (in French). 39 (12): e566–e575. doi:10.1016/j.jogc.2017.10.020. PMID 29197494.
- Olson, Rachel; Couchie, Carol (2013). "Returning birth: The politics of midwifery implementation on First Nations reserves in Canada". Midwifery. 29 (8): 981–987. doi:10.1016/j.midw.2012.12.005. PMID 23434023. ProQuest 1438667252.
- Miller, Katherine J.; Couchie, Carol; Ehman, William; Graves, Lisa; Grzybowski, Stefan; Medves, Jennifer; Dupuis, Kaitlin; Dunikowski, Lynn; Marturano, Patricia; Senikas, Vyta; Wilson, Ruth; Wootton, John (October 2012). "Rural Maternity Care". Journal of Obstetrics and Gynaecology Canada. 34 (10): 984–991. doi:10.1016/S1701-2163(16)35414-7. PMID 23067955.
- Mignone, Javier; Herrera, Jessica; Icú, Hugo; Couchie, Carol; Munro, Garry; Jiménez, Mélida; Chex, Rosa (Summer 2009). "Strengthening indigenous and intercultural midwifery: evaluation of a collaboration between Guatemalan and Canadian aboriginal organizations". Pimatisiwin. 7 (1): 133–155.
- Couchie, Carol; Sanderson, Sheila (March 2007). "Archivée: Rapport sur les pratiques optimales en ce qui concerne le retour de l'accouchement au sein des communautés autochtones rurales et éloignées" [Archived: Report on Best Practices for Returning Childbirth to Rural and Remote Indigenous Communities]. Journal of Obstetrics and Gynaecology Canada (in French). 29 (3): 255–260. doi:10.1016/S1701-2163(16)32398-2.
- Couchie, Carol; Nabigon, Herbert (1997). "A Path Towards Reclaiming Nishnawbe Birth Culture: Can the Midwifery Exemption Clause for Aboriginal Midwives Make a Difference?". In Shroff, Farah M. (ed.). The New Midwifery. Women's Press. pp. 41–50. ISBN 978-0-88961-224-2. OCLC 1285750662.

== Awards ==
- Community Heroes in Health Award, Anishinabek Nation Health Conference (2018)
- Alumni Achievement Awards, Ryerson University (2005)
