= Great Lakes Indian Fish & Wildlife Commission =

Intertribal agency in the United States

The Great Lakes Indian Fish & Wildlife Commission (GLIFWC) is an intertribal, co-management agency committed to the implementation of off-reservation treaty rights on behalf of its eleven-member Ojibwa tribes. Formed in 1984 and exercising authority specifically delegated by its member tribes, GLIFWC's mission is to help ensure significant off-reservation harvests while protecting the resources for generations to come.

== Governance ==
GLIFWC's policy is set by the Board of Commissioners composed of the tribal chairperson from each member tribe or a designee. Two standing committees, the Voigt Intertribal Task Force and the Great Lakes Fisheries Committee, make recommendations on resource management policies to the board. GLIFWC has six divisions including Administration, Biological Services, Enforcement, Intergovernmental Affairs, Planning & Development, and Public Information. Although GLIFWC's main focus is preserving the natural resources for generations to come, they are also committed to preserving the traditions and language of the Anishinaabe people.

== Coverage areas ==
- 1836 Treaty-ceded Territory (7 Stat. 491)—Co-managed with the Chippewa Ottawa Resource Authority
- 1837 Treaty-ceded Territory (7 Stat. 536)
- 1842 Treaty-ceded Territory (7 Stat. 591)
- 1854 Treaty-ceded Territory (10 Stat. 1109)—Co-managed with the 1854 Treaty Authority

== Member tribes ==
- Bad River Band of the Lake Superior Tribe of Chippewa Indians
- Bay Mills Indian Community
- Fond du Lac Band of Lake Superior Chippewa
- Keweenaw Bay Indian Community
- Lac Courte Oreilles Band of Lake Superior Chippewa Indians
- Lac du Flambeau Band of Lake Superior Chippewa
- Lac Vieux Desert Band of Lake Superior Chippewa
- Mille Lacs Band of Ojibwe
- Red Cliff Band of Lake Superior Chippewa
- Sokaogon Chippewa Community
- St. Croix Chippewa Indians of Wisconsin
