= Fred Dakota =

American casino owner (1937–2021)

Fred Dakota (June 10, 1937 – September 13, 2021) was an American casino owner. While the leader of the Keweenaw Bay Indian Community (KBIC) in Michigan, he opened one of the first tribal casinos in the United States. He fought for tribal sovereignty, his legal advocacy helped result in the 1988 Indian Gaming Regulatory Act, which legalized tribal gaming across the United States.
