= Inter-Tribal Council of Michigan =

Council of Michigan Tribes

- Inter-Tribal Council of Michigan, Inc.
- Abbreviation: ITCM
- Formation: April 16, 1968; 58 years ago
- Founders: Bay Mills Indian Community, Hannahville Potawatomi Indian Community, Keweenaw Bay Indian Community, Saginaw Chippewa Indian Tribe
- Type: Nonprofit
- Location: Sault Ste. Marie, Michigan, United States
- Members: Bay Mills Indian Community, Grand Traverse Band of Ottawa and Chippewa Indians, Hannahville Potawatomi Indian Community, Keweenaw Bay Indian Community, Lac Vieux Desert Band of Chippewa Indian Community, Little River Band of Ottawa Indians, Little Traverse Bay Bands of Odawa Indians, Match-E-Be-Nash-She-Wish Band of Pottawatomi Indians, Nottawaseppi Huron Band of the Potawatomi, Pokagon Band of Potawatomi, Sault Ste. Marie Tribe of Chippewa Indians, Saginaw-Chippewa Indian Tribe
- Website: itcmi.org

The Inter-Tribal Council of Michigan (ITCM) is a joint Tribal organization which represents the twelve federally recognized Native American tribes in the state of Michigan. It was organized as a 501(c)(3) organization in 1968 by four Michigan tribes with the intention to pool resources and aid in negotiations with non-tribal government bodies. The organization has since incorporated the other eight federally recognized tribes in Michigan and provides programs to improve the health and welfare of Native Americans in Michigan.

== Programs ==
The ITCM runs a variety of programs related to public health, tribal governance, and community resilience. These programs are often run in collaboration with other institutions such as universities and federal, state, and local governments.

Public health initiatives led by the ITCM have included healthy lifestyle programs, trainings on adapting cancer survivorship material to Anishinaabe culture, and programs to help youth quit smoking and vaping. During the COVID-19 pandemic, the ITCM partnered with popular music group The Halluci Nation (formerly known as A Tribe Called Red) to produce public service announcements promoting vaccination; they also set up mobile mammography vans to help women in tribal communities access breast cancer screening while the pandemic made normal health services more difficult to access. In 2024 the ITCM released a mobile app called Gigiigoo'inaan ("Our Fish") which helps guide safe fishing and fish consumption in the Great Lakes.

== Member Tribes ==
- Bay Mills Indian Community, original member from 1968
- Hannahville Indian Community, original member from 1968
- Keweenaw Bay Indian Community, original member from 1968
- Saginaw Chippewa Indian Tribe, original member from 1968
- Sault Tribe of Chippewa Indians, member since 1985
- Lac Vieux Desert Band of Lake Superior Chippewa, member since 1988
- Grand Traverse Band of Ottawa and Chippewa Indians
- Little Traverse Bay Bands of Odawa Indians
- Match-e-be-nash-she-wish Band of Pottawatomi Indians of Michigan (Gun Lake Tribe)
- Pokagon Band of Potawatomi Indians
- Little River Band of Ottawa Indians
- Nottawaseppi Huron Band of Potawatomi

== See also ==
- Tribal council (United States)
- Anishinaabe
- Council of Three Fires
- List of Anishinaabe tribal political organizations
