= Saganing Eagles Landing Casino =

Casino in Michigan, United States

- Interactive map of Saganing Eagles Landing Casino
- Location: 2690 Worth Rd. Standish, Michigan 48658; 43.9274°N 83.9126°W
- Opened: December 31, 2007
- Gaming space: 32,000 square feet (3,000 m^{2})
- Notable restaurants: Aerie Cafe, The Landing, Creekside Lounge
- Casino type: Land-based
- Owner: Saginaw Chippewa Indian Tribe of Michigan
- Website: www.saganing-eagleslanding.com

Saganing Eagles Landing Casino is a casino located just outside the city of Standish, Michigan, United States. Opened on December 31, 2007, the casino is owned by the Saginaw Chippewa Tribal Council, which also owns the Soaring Eagle Casino in Mount Pleasant, Michigan. This is located on the tribe's Isabella Indian Reservation.

The casino features over 800 slot machines and virtual games on the gaming floor. Traditional table games such as blackjack and roulette are offered through a virtual experience.

The casino was renovated and expanded in 2019.
