= Carla Sineway =

American academic administrator

Carla Sineway is an American academic administrator serving as the president of Saginaw Chippewa Tribal College.

== Life ==
Sineway earned a B.S. (1988) in sociology and social work and a M.A. (1995) in professional counseling from Central Michigan University. She completed a M.S. in education and enrollment management at Capella University in 2010.

Sineway specializes in education, human services, and management. She joined Saginaw Chippewa Tribal College in 1978. In 2008, Sineway worked at Saginaw Chippewa Tribal College as the dean of instruction and student services. By 2024, she had fisen to the position of president. She is an ex-officio member of the board of regents. Additionally, from 2020 to 2023, she served a three-year term on the board of trustees of the American Indian College Fund.
