= Saginaw Chippewa Tribal College =

Education organization in Mount Pleasant, United States

Coordinates: 43.6121°N 84.7311°W

- Type: Public tribal land-grant community college
- Established: 1998; 28 years ago
- President: Carla Sineway
- Location: Mount Pleasant, Michigan, United States
- Website: www.sagchip.edu

Saginaw Chippewa Tribal College (SCTC) is a public tribal land-grant community college in Mount Pleasant, Michigan, United States. The college was established in 1998 by the Saginaw Chippewa Tribal Committee.

The Isabella Reservation and the greater Mount Pleasant area are its chief service areas; the Saganing Reservation is secondary. The school focuses on maintaining the Saginaw Chippewa tribal culture, but does admit non-native students. SCTC offers degrees in Liberal Arts, General Sciences, Business, and Native American Studies with concentrations in Ojibwe and indigenous law and policy. In 2023, the college began an affiliation with Central Michigan University to offer a degree in Elementary Education. The college plans to offer baccalaureate degrees in Native Studies in the future.

== History ==
In February 2003, the Higher Learning Commission of the North Central Association awarded Initial Candidacy accreditation status to SCTC. It planned a field visit to the college. After evaluation of SCTC by the North Central Association (HLC/NCA) in November 2002, the college was approved to apply for initial candidacy to the commission's board of trustees. In November 2003, the American Indian Higher Education Consortium (AIHEC) accepted its application for membership. The following year, the college was designated a land-grant college alongside other tribal colleges first designated in 1994.

In 2005, money from the US Department of Agriculture Land Grants Fund enabled the SCTC to acquire 24 computers and other accessories for students' use. Before SCTC had one lab with 12 computers. Meanwhile, the college expanded the classroom in order to increase student enrollment. A Learning Resource Center (LRC) was appointed, and reference materials were added under the "Zaagiinoong Leadership Development Program." Participation by the SCTC Student Council has also increased. That same year, sustained land-grant federal support provided resources to the college's environmental science program, making possible renovation of the laboratory and creation of culturally relevant laboratory exercises. In addition, SCTC created more collaboration with K–12 education and cultural groups.

In fall 2006, the Technology Enhancement Committee was established. Marking of the first Annual Native American Month was conducted by the Native American Studies program. During this month, the Anishinaabe Crafts class introduced drums for use in the Saginaw Chippewa Behavioral Health Substance Abuse Program.

In April 2007, the Higher Learning Commission site team recommended initial accreditation to the HLC Executive through field visits to SCTC. In 2007, SCTC became an accredited higher education organization. SCTC credits can be accepted by four-year institutions and others for students who transfer. The college celebrated with an accreditation luncheon in October 2007.

In May 2009, the Tribal Council authorized a Memorandum of Understanding (MOU) between the SCTC and the Education Department, which established a university science laboratory facility shared by those two universities. The lab was ready for the 2009–2010 academic year. At the same time, the college opened Perspectives for Recruitment Outside of Mainstream Orientations (PROMO) Summer Program.

=== History of the SCTC Logo ===
Kathleen Hart, a student of SCTC, designed the logo. The logo features a turtle; at its center are the Great Lakes with the four cardinal directions. This draws from the Anishinabek creation story, where the turtle carries Mother Earth on its back. The lines of the tortoise shell resemble the medicine wheel, which helps the Anishinaabe balance life.

The acronym SCTC is shown at the center, with a star to indicate its location. Seven eagle feathers refer to this sacred bird in Anishinabek -- the number seven is related to the seven generations and Teachings of the Seven Grandfathers. The logo is turquoise and black, colors selected by the student body through their council.

== Campus ==
In 2005, SCTC made agreements with other organizations, including Saginaw Chippewa Tribal Library, Central Michigan University, and the Veterans' Memorial Library to provide access for its students to these library facilities.

The college does not have its own cultural center, Native museum, or cultural collection. Faculty and staff use the Tribe's museum, Ziibiwing, the 7th Generation Cultural Center, and other organizations' infrastructure. In 2007, SCTC established a library satellite site.

By 2018–2019, the SCTC Tribal Library site was providing different types of materials and resources from the Chippewa River District Library. SCTC also provides access for students to the Internet and the EBSCO Host Academic search database. SCTC Students have access to Michigan eLibrary (MeL) to view general resources. The college provides full access and privileges to the Central Michigan University Park Library.

== Organization ==
As created by the SCTC Charter, the college is managed by a Board of Regents, which consists of seven members and the college president. The Student Council President represents the student body. He/she attends all meetings of the SCTC Board of Regents as a non-voting member. The Board has the right to reorganize and investigate the policies of the institution. The president is responsible as COO for daily operations and executes policies and processes set by the Board.

=== Student Council ===
The Student Council officers are the President, Vice President, Secretary, Treasurer, and Sergeant-at-Arms. Each is elected annually, and all students at SCTS are eligible to vote. The council represents the students to the administration. It also focuses on identifying and planning official student social activities to be included in the social calendar.

=== Financial aid ===
SCTC provides financial aid to students from both federal and private sources. In 2016, 90 percent of undergraduate students received financial aid. Compared with 2015, the proportion of financial assistance to undergraduates decreased by about 2.17%. The majority of funds are from federal grants, with the remainder from state/local grants.

- Federal Financial Aid: Students are able to apply for Federal Student Aid (FAFSA) provided by the Pell Grant.
- Dreamkeepers Emergency Financial Aid Program: This program assists students who are suddenly faced with financial difficulties.
- American Indian College Fund Scholarships (TCU and Full-Circle Scholarships): This program is for the student who has excellent performance in academics, grades and life. American Indian College Fund (AICF) reviews applications together with the SCTC.

=== Scholarships ===
Types of scholarships:

1. Lilly Endowment, Inc: Woksape Oyate: "Wisdom of the People" Distinguished Scholar Award
2. Women's Self Worth Foundation Scholarship
3. Nissan North America, Inc. Scholarship
4. National Indian Gaming Association (NIGA) Tribal College Scholarship
5. IBM Tribal College Scholarship
6. San Manuel Band of Mission Indians Tribal Scholarship

== Academic profile ==
=== Faculties, administrative and staff ===
In 2022, the Saginaw Chippewa Tribal College had seven full-time faculty, seventeen adjusted faculty, five senior administrators, and fourteen staff. The College has also opened a writing center, houses a branch of the Saginaw Chippewa Tribal Library and has an active Land Grant office. The Student-to-faculty Ratio in 2014 was 8:1. From 2017 to 2018, the ratio was 7:1.

=== Ranking ===
==== Establish-2016 ====
Based on 2014 data, the Saginaw Chippewa Tribal College ranked 16th for Graduation Rate (within six years) through tribal colleges. Meanwhile, the Percentage of Pell Grantees, Average Discount for Low-Income Students(per year), Total Cost of Attendance(per year) of the SCTC ranked at 15th, 5th and 11th place separately.

The Saginaw Chippewa Tribal College ranked at 591 place in Total federal obligations ranking and retrieved the 992 place within its institutions ranked during 2016.

==== 2017-2018 ====
Saginaw Chippewa Tribal College ranked the 21st most Affordable School in Michigan, the 194th in The Midwest and the 718th in USA. Meanwhile, the SCTC achieved the 566th Cheap Business school in USA National Ranking. According to a Watchdog analysis of federal tuition data for 2017–18, the Saginaw Chippewa Tribal College had the lowest in-state tuitions in Michigan.

Saginaw Chippewa Tribal College management program ranking showed that the college ranked at the 2991st Management School in the United States and retrieved the 81 place of Management School in Michigan. For the business program ranks during 2018, the college achieved the 2860th Business School in the United States and the 81st Business School in Michigan.
