= Bandolier bag =

Shoulder bag carried by Native Americans

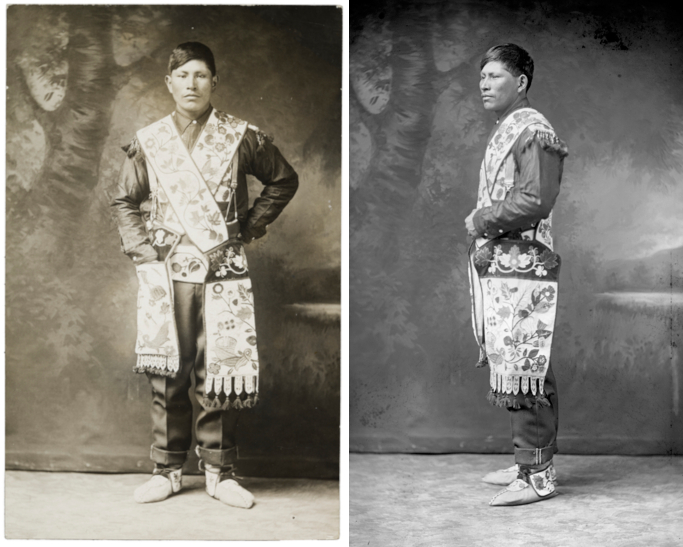
Portrait of Pete Moos, Mille Lacs Band of Ojibwe, c1913 by photographer Ross A. Daniels. The photo shows the two gashkibidaaganag (bandolier bags) and the spot-stitch appliqué featuring complex layered and assembled motifs that are associated with the Mille Lacs Band.

A bandolier bag is a Native American shoulder pouch, often beaded. Early examples were made from pelts, twined fabrics, or hide, but beginning in the fur trade era, Native American women stitched bags of imported wool broadcloth, lined with cotton calico and often edged with silk ribbons.

== Name ==
The bags are named for bandoliers or the cloths carrying gunpowder that soldiers wore from the 16th to early 20th centuries. They are also called shot pouches or simply shoulder bags.

In Ojibwemowin, or the Ojibwe language, bandolier bags are called gashkibidaagan. The Ojibwe name comes from the word parts, gashk-, meaning "enclosed, attached together" and -bid, "tie it."

The English word bandolier comes from the French word bandouliere meaning "shoulder belt" and traces back to the Spanish bandoera the diminutive of banda or "sash."

== Use ==
A bandolier bag may be worn either across the shoulder to the side or in front like an apron. Men wore them and placed valuables such as tobacco, pipes, medicine, or flint for starting fires.

== Gallery ==
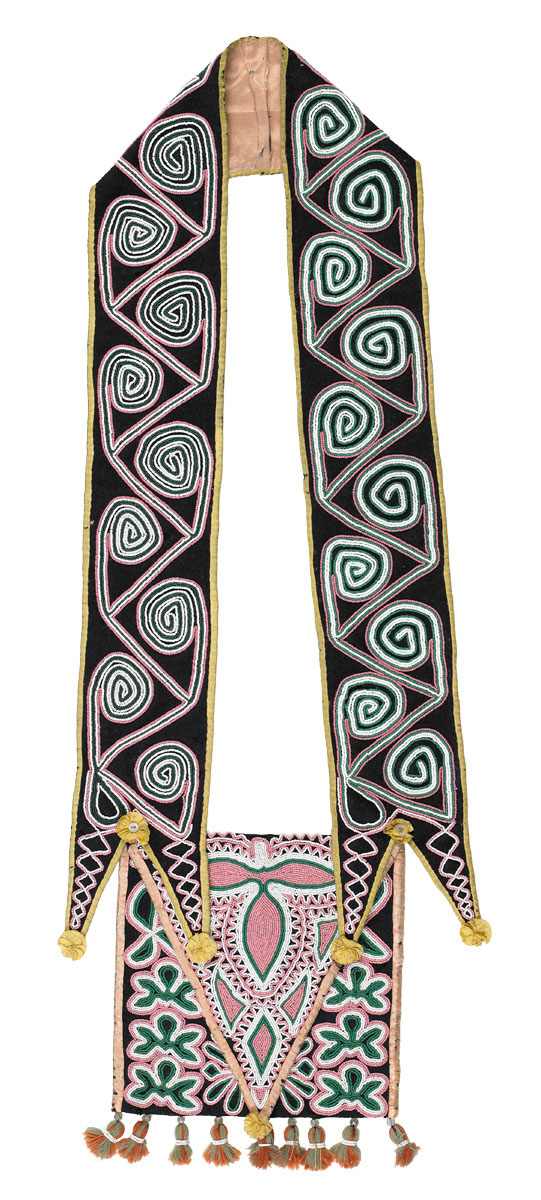
Muscogee bandolier bag, c. 1820, wool, cotton, silk, glass beads, Birmingham Museum of Art

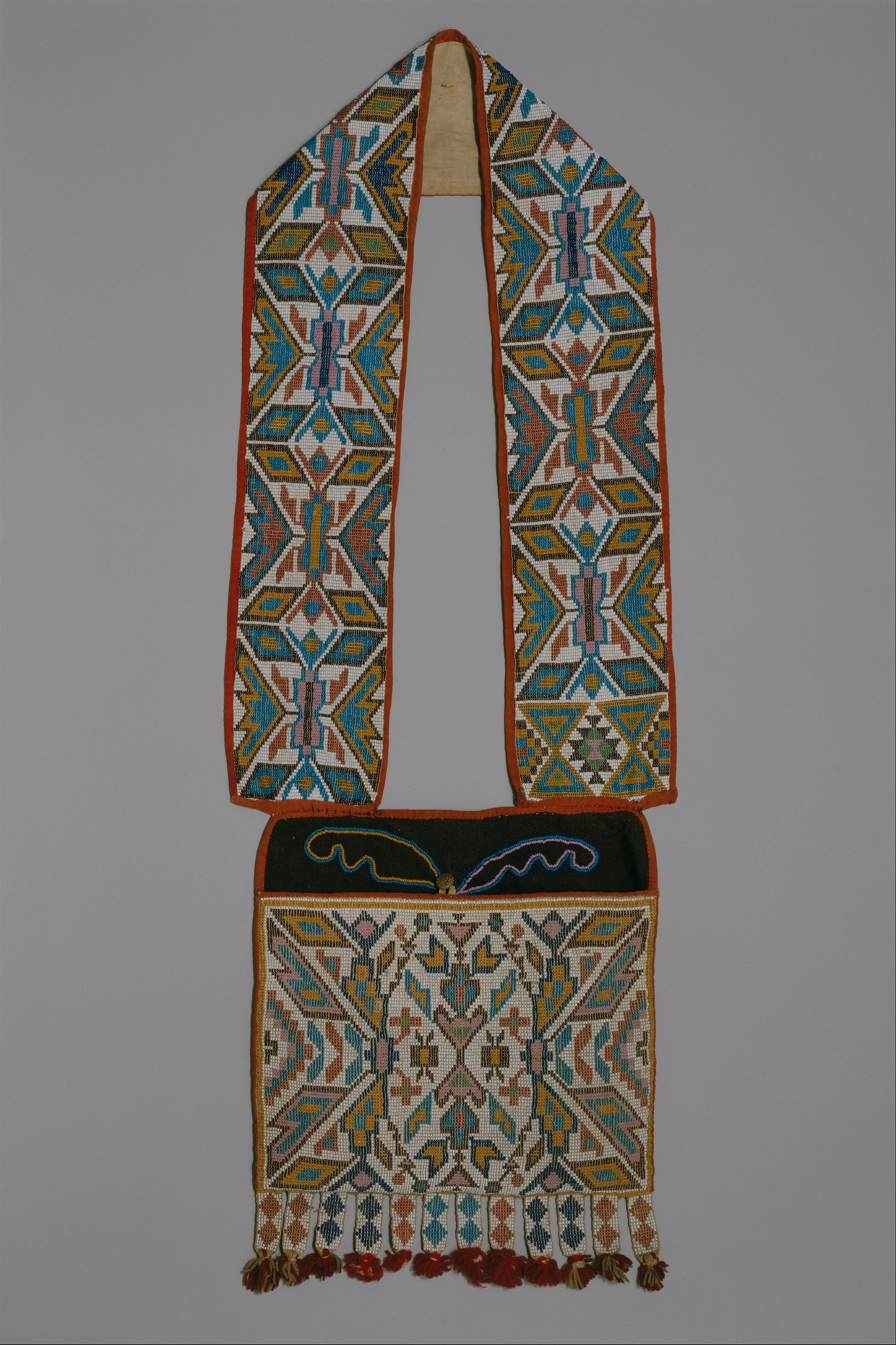
Loom-beaded bandolier bag attributed to Winnebago people, c. 1880s, collection of the Metropolitan Museum of Art

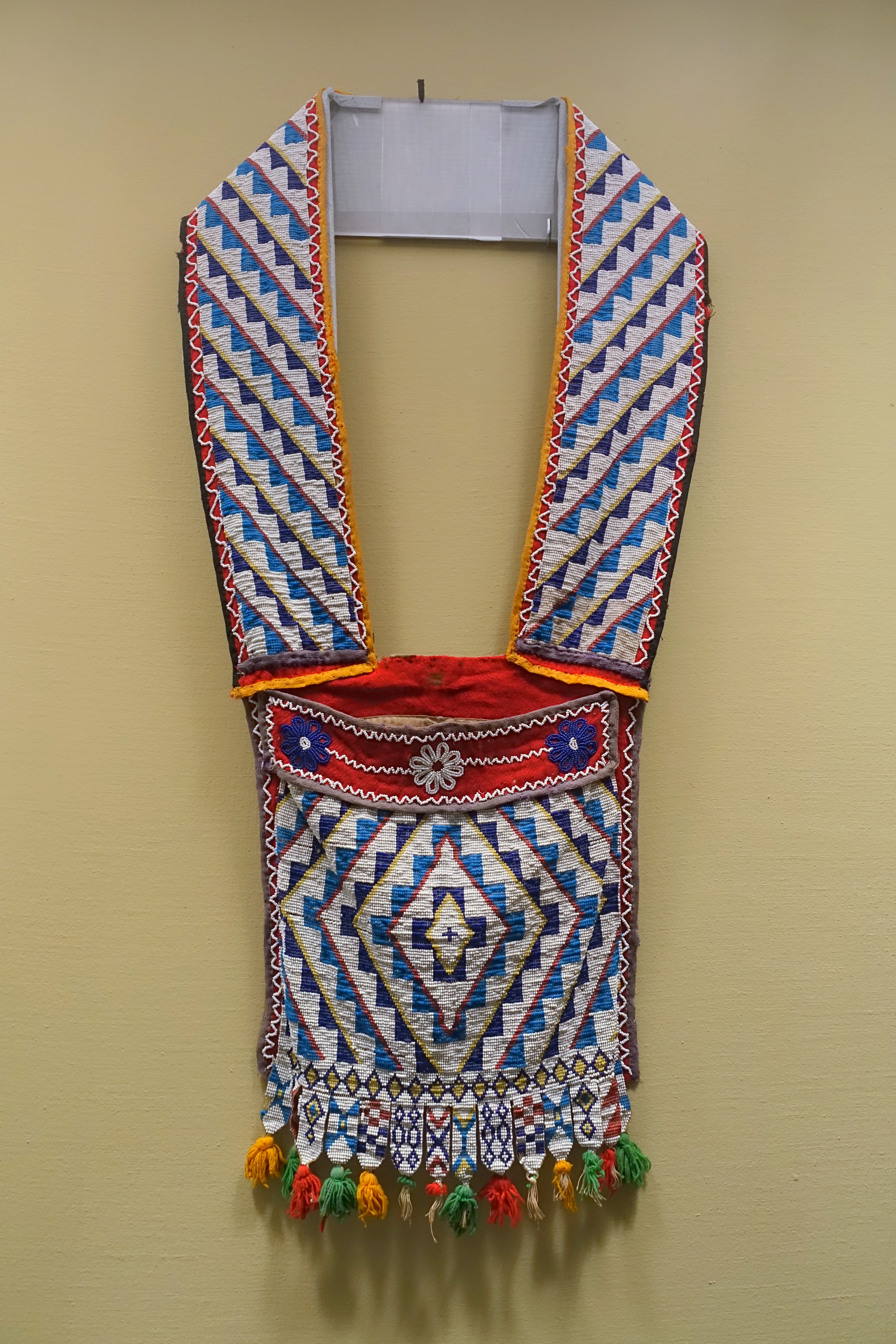
Woodlands artist, Bandolier Bag, ca. 1840, wool, cotton, and glass beads, Portland Art Museum.

== See also ==
- Anishinaabe Shoulder Bag
