= Society of Obstetricians and Gynaecologists of Canada =

The Society of Obstetricians and Gynaecologists of Canada
- Abbreviation: SOGC
- Formation: 1944
- Type: Not-for-profit
- Headquarters: Ottawa, Ontario, Canada
- Location: Canada
- Region served: National
- Members: 3000
- Official language: English and French
- President: Lynn Murphy-Kaulbeck
- Main organ: Executive Committee
- Website: www.sogc.org

The Society of Obstetricians and Gynaecologists of Canada (SOGC) is a national medical society in Canada, representing over 3,200 obstetricians/gynaecologists, family physicians, nurses, midwives, and allied health professionals in the field of sexual reproductive health.

Having been operational for more than 7 decades, the number of participants might rise surpassing the original number making it one of the most valuable society of obstetricians in the world.

== Status and activities ==
The SOGC has been granted accreditation by the Royal College of Physicians and Surgeons of Canada (RCPSC) as a Continued Professional Development provider for physicians and health care providers in Canada. The Society offers professional educational including the Annual Clinical Meeting, RCPSC-accredited Continuing Medical Education (CME) programs, e-learning modules, and its Managing Obstetrical Risk Efficiently (MORE^{OB}) patient safety program.

The SOGC produces national clinical guidelines for both public and medical education on women's health, and publishes the monthly Journal of Obstetrics and Gynaecology Canada (JOGC), Canada's peer-reviewed journal of obstetrics, gynaecology, and women's health.

The ALARM (Advances in Labour and Risk Management) International Program, a training tool designed to reduce maternal death or injury in developing countries, has been delivered in over 20 countries around the world by SOGC member volunteers.

The SOGC received a $1,052,726 grant from the Public Health Agency of Canada's Immunization Partnership Fund to conduct surveys and focus groups of women of reproductive age and health care providers on the topic of vaccination. Tools were developed based on these results in order to combat vaccine hesitancy. During the COVID-19 pandemic, these materials were updated in order to increase uptake of COVID-19 vaccines in pregnant or fertile women.

On May 28, 2025, the SOGC issued a statement insisting that pregnant and breastfeeding women should continue to receive COVID-19 vaccines as "pregnant women who become infected with COVID-19 are more likely to be hospitalized and require intensive care than women who are not pregnant." The Canadian Press reported that the SOGC's statement came one day after Secretary of Health and Human Services Robert F. Kennedy Jr. declared the shots were no longer recommended for healthy children and pregnant women in the United States.

== History ==
The SOGC was founded in 1944. The members of its Founding Council, which governed from 1944 to 1945, were:

- President: Léon Gérin-Lajoie
- President-elect: William A. Scott
- Vice-president: John D. McQueen
- Secretary: James C. Goodwin
- Treasurer: D. Nelson Henderson
- Councillors: Arthur B. Nash and Hector Sanche

Léon Gérin-Lajoie, the SOGC's first president, suggested the name "Society of Obstetricians and Gynecologists of Canada – Société des obstétriciens et gynécologues du Canada". Gérin-Lajoie was one of several SOGC representatives at the International Federation of Gynecology and Obstetrics (FIGO) First World Congress in 1954 and went on to become FIGO's vice-president in 1957 and president in 1958.

Beginning in the late 1980s, the SOGC gradually broadened its purpose to include international women's health, advocacy, Indigenous health, public education, patient safety, and human resources in obstetrics and gynaecology. During this period, the Society also began admitting members of related medical professions, such as nursing and midwifery.

The Society of Obstetricians and Gynecologists of Canada created an Aboriginal Health Issues Committee, and Carol Couchie served as its chair person.
