= Gail George =

Saginaw Chippewa Tribal Chief

Gail Lorraine George
- Born: Gail Lorraine Kahgegab; May 28, 1946; Mt. Pleasant, Michigan
- Died: December 11, 2020 (aged 74); Mt. Pleasant, Michigan
- Occupation: Native American leader
- Known for: First female Chief of Saginaw Chippewa Tribal Nation
- Spouse(s): Henry George, Sr. (married 1968)
- Children: 4

Gail Lorraine George (born Gail Lorraine Kahgegab; May 18, 1946 – December 11, 2020) was a healthcare professional and leader within the Saginaw Chippewa Tribal Nation. She served as the tribe's first female Tribal Chief from 1993 to 1995.

== Personal life ==
George was born as Gail Lorraine Kahgegab in Mt. Pleasant, Michigan on May 28, 1946, to her parents, Ernest and Florence (Jackson) Kahgegab. On May 25, 1968, she married her husband, Henry George, Sr.

She had four children – Amanda, Henry, Michelle, and Nathaniel – with her husband.

Her husband, Henry, died on July 30, 1990. His death was followed soon after by the death of her son, Henry George Jr. on November 11, 1990.

George died on December 11, 2020, at her home in Mt. Pleasant at the age of 74.

== Professional work ==
George retired as the Health Director at the Nimkee Memorial Wellness Center in Mt. Pleasant. She held various other positions during her thirty-year career with the Saginaw Chippewa Tribal Nation, including chaplain.

== Tribal leadership ==
George served on the Tribal Council of the Saginaw Chippewa Tribal Nation. She played an active role in the development and building of the tribe's Soaring Eagle Casino and Resort. George and her husband, Henry, started the concessions operations at the tribe's bingo hall.

She served from 1993 to 1995 as the first female Tribal Chief of the Saginaw Chippewa Tribal Nation.
