= WGLI =

Radio station in Hancock, Michigan

- Hancock, Michigan; United States
- Broadcast area: Keweenaw Peninsula
- Frequency: 98.7 MHz
- Branding: The Rockin' Eagle

Programming
- Format: Active rock
- Affiliations: Detroit Lions Radio Network

Ownership
- Owner: Keweenaw Bay Indian Community
- Sister stations: WCUP, WMQT, WZAM

History
- First air date: March 11, 2003
- Call sign meaning: Eagle

Technical information
- Licensing authority: FCC
- Facility ID: 81328
- Class: C1
- ERP: 100,000 watts
- HAAT: 159 meters (522 ft)
- Transmitter coordinates: 47°06′13″N 88°34′04″W
- Repeater: 970 WZAM (Ishpeming)

Links
- Public license information: Public file; LMS
- Webcast: Listen live
- Website: www.keepitintheup.com/the-rockin-eagle-98-7-wgli/

WGLI (98.7 FM) is an active rock formatted broadcast radio station licensed to Hancock, Michigan, serving the Keweenaw Peninsula. WGLI is owned and operated by Keweenaw Bay Indian Community.

== Coverage and programming ==
Primarily serving the Keweenaw Bay Indian Community and the Keweenaw Peninsula at 100,000 watts.
