= Biinjitiwaabik Zaaging Anishinaabek =

Rocky Bay 197
- Indian reserve
- Rocky Bay Indian Reserve No. 197
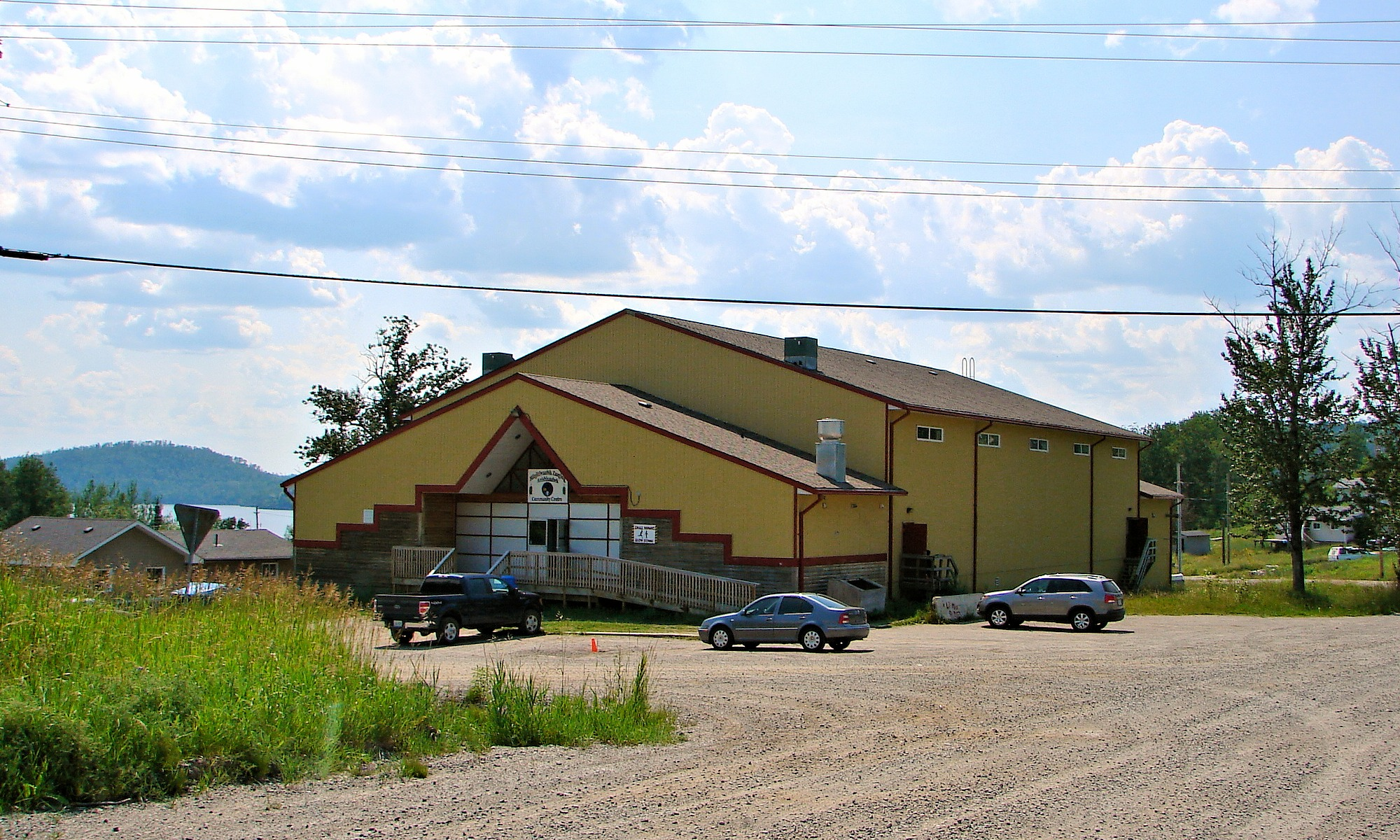
- Rocky Bay community centre

- Location within Ontario
- Coordinates: 49°26′N 88°08′W
- Country: Canada
- Province: Ontario
- District: Thunder Bay
- First Nation: Biinjitiwabik Zaaging Anishinabek

Area
  - Land: 0.41 km^{2} (0.16 sq mi)

Population (2011)
  - Total: 182
  - Density: 441.6/km^{2} (1,144/sq mi)
- Website: www.rockybayfn.ca

Biinjitiwaabik Zaaging Anishinaabek (formerly known as Rocky Bay First Nation) is an Ojibway First Nation band government in Northwestern Ontario, Canada. Their territory is located on the Rocky Bay 1 reserve in Greenstone, Ontario, bordering on the community of Macdiarmid. In October 2008, they had a total registered population of 678 people, of which 327 people lived on their own Indian reserve. The Nation is led by Chief Gladys Thompson. The council is a member of Nokiiwin Tribal Council, a Regional Chiefs' Council, and is member of Union of Ontario Indians, a Tribal Political Organization. The First Nation is also a member of Waaskiinaysay Ziibi Inc., an economic development corporation made up of five Lake Nipigon First Nations.

== History ==
The first nation's television series Spirit Bay was filmed here in the 1980s. A modern school in Rocky Bay has been named the "Spirit Bay School" after the series.

In June 1994, the Chiefs at the Anishinabek Grand Council on the Rocky Bay First Nation, directed that the Education Directorate formally establish the Anishinabek Education Institute (AEI) in accordance with the post secondary education model that was submitted and ratified. (Res. 94/13)
