= WCUP =

- L'Anse, Michigan; United States
- Broadcast area: Keweenaw Peninsula
- Frequency: 105.7 MHz
- Branding: Eagle Country 105.7

Programming
- Format: Country
- Affiliations: ABC News Radio; Green Bay Packers Radio Network

Ownership
- Owner: Keweenaw Bay Indian Community
- Sister stations: WGLI

History
- First air date: April 30, 1998
- Former call signs: WAAE (1995, CP)
- Call sign meaning: C (see) the Upper Peninsula

Technical information
- Licensing authority: FCC
- Facility ID: 36092
- Class: C1
- ERP: 51,000 watts
- HAAT: 261 meters (856 ft)
- Transmitter coordinates: 46°39′50″N 88°23′06″W

Links
- Public license information: Public file; LMS
- Webcast: Listen live
- Website: keepitintheup.com/eagle-country.html

WCUP is a Country formatted broadcast radio station licensed to L'Anse, Michigan, serving the Keweenaw Peninsula. WCUP is owned and operated by Keweenaw Bay Indian Community.
