= Anishinaabe Shoulder Bag =

The Anishinaabe shoulder bag, also known as a bandolier bag, is a decorated Indigenous textile bag associated with Anishinaabe communities of the Great Lakes region. These bags are known for their elaborate beadwork, designs, and cultural significance. They were used on important occasions and continue to be made by Anishinaabe artists today. The bags are a ceremonial and meaningful peace in these communities.
