= Saginaw Chippewa Tribal Nation =

Saginaw Chippewa Indian Tribe of Michigan
Ziibiwing Anishinaabek
- The official Saginaw Chippewa Logo designed by Elder Julius Peters

Total population
- 3,296

Regions with significant populations
- United States (Michigan)

Languages
- English, Ojibwe

Religion
- Christianity, traditional tribal religion

Related ethnic groups
- Potawatomi

Saginaw Chippewa Indian Tribe of Michigan (Ojibwe: Ziibiwing Anishinaabek) is a federally recognized tribe of Chippewa (a.k.a. Ojibwe) located in central Michigan in the United States. The tribal government offices are located on the Isabella Indian Reservation, near the city of Mount Pleasant in Isabella County. They also hold land on the Saganing Reservation near Standish. As of February 2007, tribal membership was approximately 3,296. The 2010 US Census reports 2,414 persons living in the Mount Pleasant, Michigan micropolitan area are Native American.

== Economy ==
The tribe owns and operates several gaming and recreation facilities on its property in Mount Pleasant:

- Soaring Eagle Casino
- Soaring Eagle Waterpark and Hotel
- Soaring Eagle Hideaway RV Park
- Retreat at Soaring Eagle

In addition, it operates Eagle Bay Marina and Saganing Eagles Landing Casino in Standish. These generate revenue for investment in education and welfare for the tribe, including such facilities as a new elders' center.

Besides its gaming enterprises, the tribe owns the Sagamok Express Mobil Gas Stations in Mount Pleasant and Standish, the Cardinal Pharmacy and Migizi Economic Development Corp. at the Sowmick Plaza in Mount Pleasant. It also makes online sales through Amazon and Walmart.com under its Ziibiwing Commercial Services Warehouse in Mount Pleasant.

== Government and operations ==
Map showing sites of Indian reservations in northern Michigan.

The tribe operates community facilities, including a substance-abuse treatment center, a community clinic, and health facilities. In the early 21st century, the tribe opened a new Elders' Center.

The tribe operates the Saginaw Chippewa Academy (an elementary school). They also have Native American advocates and tutors who work with students in the local public schools.

The tribe operates the Saginaw Chippewa Tribal College, a two-year community college open to all in the region. The Nation has an agreement with Central Michigan University that allows students to readily transfer credits to CMU to complete a 4-year degree there.

The tribe hosts a pow-wow every year during the last full weekend in July. This competition pow-wow takes place at the grounds on "the Hill" (the only rise on the otherwise flat Isabella Reservation). The Hill is also the site of the tribal campgrounds and the Chippewa Indian Methodist Church.

== History ==
They have lived in eastern Michigan since at least the 1300s and comprise three bands: the Saginaw, Black River, and Swan Creek bands.

In 1966, the nation was among the four founders of the Inter-Tribal Council of Michigan, established to pool resources for development and to improve relations with state and federal governments. Others are the Bay Mills Indian Community, Keneenaw Potawatomi Indian Community, and Hannahville Indian Community. They have worked together since. In the early 21st century, the Council consists of members from 11 of the 12 federally recognized tribes in Michigan. In 1998, the tribe established Saginaw Chippewa Tribal College. Since 2007, it has been an accredited two-year community college.

In 1993, the tribe elected their first female Tribal Chief, Gail George, who served until 1995.

On December 2, 2019, the tribe signed a memorandum of understanding with the Michigan Department of Natural Resources to co-manage the Sanilac Petroglyphs Historic State Park in Sanilac County. This agreement marks the first state-tribal co-management of a Michigan state park.
