= Nipissing First Nation =

Anishinaabeg First Nation in Ontario, Canada

- Band No. 220
- Nbisiing
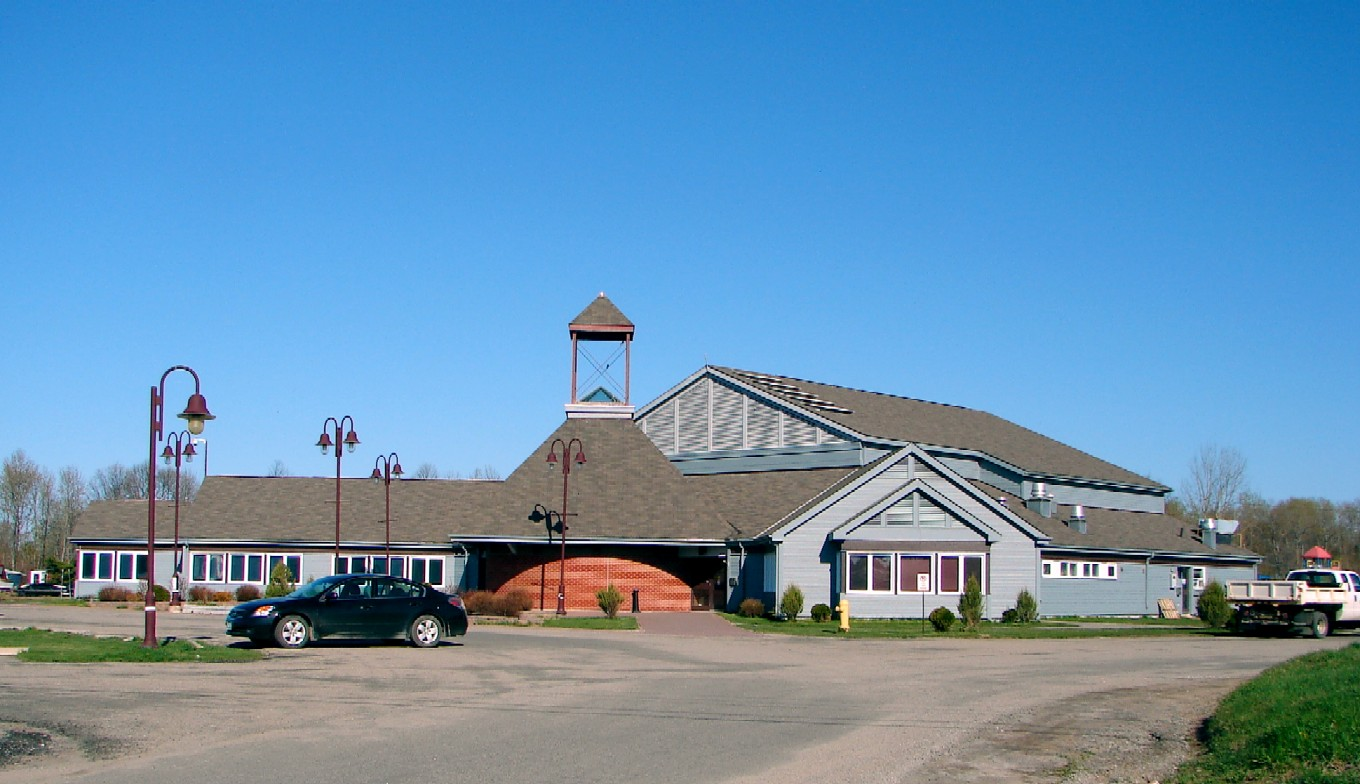
- Administration Building and Community Centre in Garden Village
- People: Nbisiing Anishinaabeg
- Treaty: Robinson–Huron Treaty
- Headquarters: Garden Village
- Province: Ontario

Land
- Main reserve: Nipissing 10
- Land area: 21,007.3 ha (210.073 km^{2}; 81.110 sq mi)

Population (March 2026)
- On reserve: 1,004
- Off reserve: 2,651
- Total population: 3,688

Government
- Chief: Cathy Stevens
- Council: Rick Stevens; Joan McLeod-Shabogesic; Yvette Bellefeuille; Samantha Stevens; Priscilla Goulais; Jason Laronde

Tribal Council
- Waabnoong Bemjiwang Association of First Nations

Website
- https://nfn.ca/

Nipissing First Nation (Ojibwe: Nbisiing) is an Anishinaabe First Nation in Nipissing District, northeastern Ontario, Canada. Its members are the Nbisiing Anishinaabeg, a people of Ojibwe and Algonquin descent whose homeland is centred on the north shore of Lake Nipissing. The First Nation's main reserve is Nipissing 10, located between North Bay and West Nipissing.

Nipissing First Nation is a signatory to the Robinson–Huron Treaty of 1850. It is affiliated with the Waabnoong Bemjiwang Association of First Nations, a regional chiefs' council, and the Anishinabek Nation.

== History ==
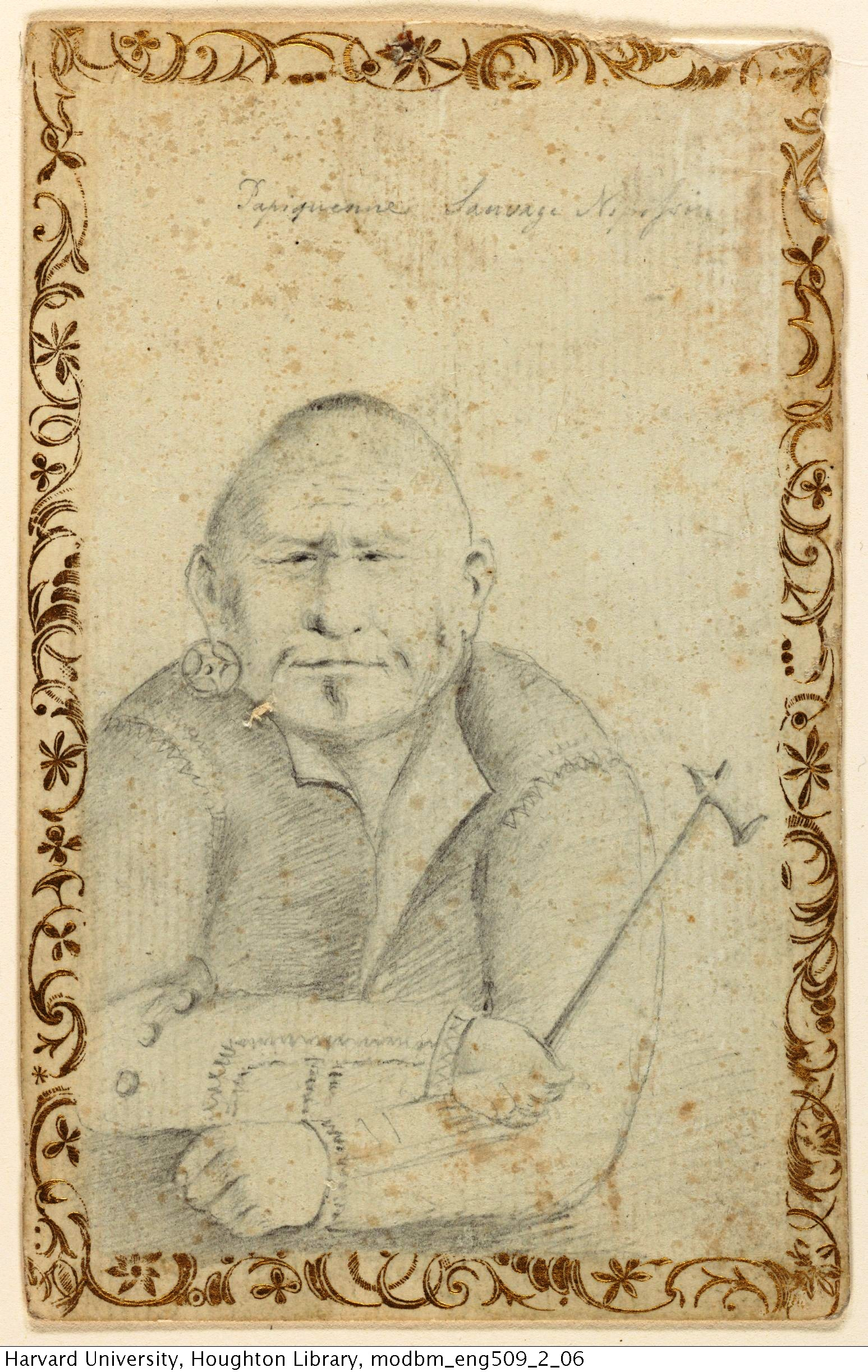
Sketch of an 18th-century Nipissing man by Henry Hamilton

Nipissing First Nation identifies the Lake Nipissing region as the ancestral homeland of the Nbisiing Anishinaabeg. The First Nation states that the Nbisiing Anishinaabeg have lived in the area since time immemorial and that archaeological studies indicate occupation of Lake Nipissing and its environs for nearly 10,000 years.

Historical accounts describe the Nipissing as an Algonquian people associated with Lake Nipissing and nearby travel and trade routes. A 1910 entry in the Handbook of American Indians North of Mexico recorded that some Nipissing people moved to the Lake Nipigon area during the seventeenth century and later returned to Lake Nipissing; some later settled near Trois-Rivières and Oka, Quebec.

The Robinson–Huron Treaty was signed at Sault Ste. Marie on 9 September 1850 between the Crown and Anishinaabe chiefs from the north and east shores of Lake Huron. Nipissing First Nation is one of the twenty-one Robinson–Huron Treaty First Nations. The treaty set aside reserves and confirmed continuing hunting and fishing rights for the signatory First Nations.

== Reserve and communities ==
Nipissing First Nation's main reserve is Nipissing 10, an Indian reserve on the north shore of Lake Nipissing. Crown–Indigenous Relations and Northern Affairs Canada lists the reserve as reserve number 06152, located between North Bay and Sturgeon Falls, with an area of 21,007.3 hectares. Natural Resources Canada records Nipissing 10 as an official geographical name and identifies it as an Indian reserve in Ontario.

The First Nation describes Nipissing 10 as an urban reserve with a land base extending more than 30 kilometres between North Bay and West Nipissing, approximately 320 kilometres north of Toronto. It lists eleven communities on the reserve: Garden Village, Veteran's Lane, Mosquito Creek, Jocko Point, Paradise Point, Meadowside, Beaucage Subdivision, Beaucage Village, Serenity Lane, Yellek, and Duchesnay. The First Nation's administrative offices are in Garden Village.

== Language and culture ==
Nipissing First Nation identifies its people as the Nbisiing Anishinaabeg. Their nation's ratified constitution, the Gichi-Naaknigewin (lit. "big law"), recognizes Anishinaabemwin as their official language, with English as a secondary language.

An early twentieth-century ethnographic source recorded five Nipissing doodems: Blood, Birchbark, Heron, Beaver and Squirrel. The same source also recorded variant historical spellings for some clan names, reflecting older European-language transcriptions of Anishinaabe names.

== Demographics ==
As of March 2026, Crown–Indigenous Relations and Northern Affairs Canada recorded 3,694 registered members of Nipissing First Nation. Of these, 1,004 lived on the First Nation's own reserve, 27 lived on other reserves, 6 lived on Crown land, and 2,651 lived off reserve.

== Governance ==
Nipissing First Nation is governed under a custom electoral system. Its council consists of a Gimaa or chief, an Aanke Gimaa or deputy chief, and six E-giigdowaad or councillors, elected on a three-year cycle.

For the 2024–2027 term, the chief is Cathy Stevens and the deputy chief is Brian Couchie. The councillors are Rick Stevens, Joan McLeod-Shabogesic, Yvette Bellefeuille, Samantha Stevens, Priscilla Goulais and Jason Laronde.

In 2014, Nipissing First Nation ratified the Gichi-Naaknigewin. A CBC Radio-Canada report, reproduced by the Indigenous Governance Database of the Native Nations Institute, described it as the first ratified constitution of a First Nation in Ontario.

Nipissing First Nation is a member of the Waabnoong Bemjiwang Association of First Nations, which also provides services to Dokis, Henvey Inlet, Magnetawan, Wahnapitae and Wasauksing First Nations. The First Nation is also part of the Anishinabek Nation.

== Notable people ==
- Christian Allaire, fashion journalist
- Athanasie Cadot, diplomat and trader
- Carol Couchie, registered midwife and Indigenous maternal-health advocate
- Jenny Kay Dupuis, author, artist, and educator
- Dan Frawley, former National Hockey League player
- Ian Campeau, musician, activist and former member of A Tribe Called Red

== See also ==
- Anishinabek Educational Institute
- List of First Nations band governments
- List of Indian reserves in Ontario
- Nipissing Indian Reserve 10
- Robinson Treaties
