= 1854 Treaty Authority =

Native American natural resource organization based in Minnesota

The 1854 Treaty Authority is an inter-tribal natural resource management organization committed to protecting and implementing the off-reservation hunting, fishing, and gathering rights for the Bois Forte Band of Chippewa and the Grand Portage Band of Chippewa in the lands ceded to the United States government under the Treaty of La Pointe.

Based out of Duluth, Minnesota, 1854 Treaty Authority's policy is set by the Board of Commissioners composed of the tribal chairperson from each member tribe or a designee. 1854 Treaty Authority has four divisions including Administration, Resource Management, Education and Outreach, and Conservation Enforcement.

== History ==
In 1985, The Grand Portage Band of Lake Superior Chippewa filed suit in U.S. District Court seeking a declaratory judgment that the 1854 Treaty of La Pointe reserved the Band's right to hunt and fish in the 1854 Treaty-Ceded Territory free of state regulation. The other Bands that signed the treaty and resided in the territory (Fond du Lac Band, Bois Forte Band) subsequently joined the lawsuit. By 1988, an out of court settlement was negotiated, resulting in a memorandum of agreement between the bands and the State of Minnesota in which their treaty rights were confirmed.

To enforce the regulations outlined in the agreement, in 1988, the Tri-Band Authority was established to implement the agreement and was governed by a Board of Directors, which consisted of the duly elected officials of each of the Grand Portage, Bois Forte, and the Fond du Lac Bands. However, in 1989, Fond du Lac (who is now a party to the Great Lakes Indian Fish & Wildlife Commission) withdrew from the agreement. The Tri-Band Authority then became the 1854 Authority and was subsequently renamed in 2006 to the 1854 Treaty Authority. Today, they continue to implement the agreement for the Grand Portage and Bois Forte Bands.

== Coverage areas ==
- Grand Portage Fishing Zone of Minnesota's portion of the 1842 Treaty of La Pointe-ceded Territory (7 Stat. 591)
- 1854 Treaty of La Pointe-ceded Territory (10 Stat. 1109)—Co-managed with the Great Lakes Indian Fish & Wildlife Commission
- 1866 Treaty of Washington (Bois Forte band of Chippewa Indians)-ceded territory (14 Stat. 765)—No hunting, fishing or gathering, but cultural resources are reviewed and enforced.

== Issues ==
The 1854 Treaty Authority has advocated the restoration of Big Rice Lake and monitors the growth of wild rice plants there.

== Member tribes ==
- Bois Forte Band of Chippewa
- Fond du Lac Band of Lake Superior Chippewa (former member)
- Grand Portage Band of Chippewa
