= Anishinabek Nation =

First Nations organization in Ontario, Canada

- Ngo Dwe Waanigzid Anishinabe
- Formation: 1949
- Headquarters: Anishinabek Nation Head Office
- Location: Nipissing First Nation, North Bay, Ontario, Canada
- Members: 39 First Nations
- Official language: Anishinabemowin (Ojibwe)
- Anishinabek Nation Grand Council Chief: Linda Debassige
- Anishinabek Nation Deputy Grand Council Chief: Chris Plain
- Key people: Marcia Trudeau-Bomberry, CEO
- Main organ: Grand Council Assembly
- Website: www.anishinabek.ca
- Formerly called: Union of Ontario Indians

The Anishinabek Nation, also known as the Union of Ontario Indians, is a First Nations political organization representing 39 member Anishinabek Nation First Nations in Canada in the province of Ontario, Canada.

As of 2026, there are about 70,000 citizens of the Anishinabek Nation member communities, accounting for about one-third of the total First Nations population in the province of Ontario.

== History ==
The organization's roots predate European contact in the 16th century, in the Council of Three Fires.

The Union of Ontario Indians was incorporated in 1949 to serve as a political advocate and secretariat for the Anishinabek First Nations. The Anishinabek peoples speak Anishinaabemowin and Lunaape (in Munsee Delaware Nation) within the Anishinabek Nation territory in Ontario.

The nation's logo is a stylized thunderbird, which was created in the 1970s by Nick Deleary.

In 2007 the organization appointed an Anishinabek Women's Water Commission to advise on water issues and management of the Great Lakes.

In 2017, the Council changed its identification using the name "Union of Ontario Indians" only for legally-binding agreements but for all other purposes referred to themselves as Anishinabek Nation.

== Leadership Council ==
The Anishinabek Nation is guided by a Leadership Council, consisting of a Grand Council Chief, four Regional Deputy Grand Council Chiefs, and Nation Councils representing four geographic regions: Southeast, Southwest, Lake Huron, and Northern Superior.

The restructuring that introduced the current four regional deputy grand council chiefs occurred in 2018.

The head office for the Union of Ontario Indians is located in North Bay, Ontario.

As of 2026, the Grand Council consists of:

- Grand Council Chief Linda Debassige (M'Chigeeng First Nation)
- Deputy Grand Council Chief Chris Plain (Aamjiwnaang First Nation)
- Regional Chief Scott McLeod (Lake Huron, Nipissing First Nation)
- Regional Chief Melvin Hardy (Northern Superior, Biinjitiwaabik Zaaging Anishinaabek)
- Regional Chief Marsha Smoke (Southeast, Alderville First Nation)
- Regional Chief Joe Miskokomon (Southwest, Chippewas of the Thames First Nation)
- Wiikwemkoong Representative Ogimaa Tim Ominika (Wiikwemkoong Unceded Territory)

== See also ==
- Anishinabek Police Service
- Anishinabek Educational Institute
- Anishinabek News
