= Anishinabek Educational Institute =

Indigenous post-secondary institute in Ontario, Canada

- Motto: Forever to the 7th Generation
- Type: Indigenous post-secondary institute
- Established: 1994
- Academic affiliations: Indigenous Institutes Consortium
- Director: Mindy Taylor
- Location: 1 Migizi Miikan Road, PO Box 711, North Bay, Ontario, Canada
- Campuses and sites: Nipissing, Munsee-Delaware and Fort William
- Website: aeipostsecondary.ca

Anishinabek Educational Institute (AEI) is an Indigenous post-secondary institute in Ontario, Canada. It is mandated by the Anishinabek Nation to provide education and training programs for Anishinabek First Nation communities. AEI is prescribed as an Indigenous Institute under Ontario Regulation 239/18, made under the Indigenous Institutes Act, 2017, as "Anishinabek Educational Institute as represented by the Union of Ontario Indians".

The institute's main campus and office are on Nipissing First Nation, near North Bay. Its programming is also associated with campus or satellite locations at Munsee-Delaware Nation and Fort William First Nation.

== History ==
The institute traces its origins to Anishinabek Nation education planning in the early 1990s. According to AEI's own history, the Anishinabek Grand Council directed the Union of Ontario Indians Education Directorate in June 1993 to develop a model for an Anishinabek post-secondary institution, including satellite campuses and community-based delivery. In June 1994, Chiefs in Assembly at the Anishinabek Grand Council directed that the Education Directorate formally establish the Anishinabek Educational Institute in accordance with that model.

The Indigenous Institutes Consortium describes AEI as established in 1994 and as providing programming responsive to First Nations' needs. A 2025 profile in Maclean's gives the founding date as 1993 and describes the main campus as being on Nipissing First Nation.

In December 2017, Ontario passed the Indigenous Institutes Act, 2017, recognizing Indigenous Institutes as a distinct part of Ontario's post-secondary education system. Ontario Regulation 239/18 lists AEI among the Indigenous Institutes prescribed for the purposes of the Act.

== Campuses and delivery ==
AEI's campus page lists a Nipissing campus, approximately 5 km west of North Bay at the Union of Ontario Indians head office on Nipissing First Nation, and a Munsee-Delaware campus, approximately 40 km west of London. The Munsee-Delaware campus offers on-campus and community-based delivery. The Indigenous Institutes Consortium also lists a Fort William campus at Fort William First Nation.

AEI describes its programs as full-time and delivered through community-based, combination or on-campus formats. In combination delivery, students attend intensive in-class sessions and then return to their communities while continuing course work; on-campus delivery requires daily in-class participation during the semester.

== Programs and partnerships ==
AEI offers certificate and diploma programs. Programs listed by the Indigenous Institutes Consortium include Native Community Worker: Traditional Healing Methods, Binoojiingyag Kinoomaadziwin: Early Childhood Education, Practical Nurse, Social Service Worker, First Nation Child Welfare Advocate, Personal Support Worker and Pre-Health Sciences.

In 2025, Maclean's described AEI as having a student body of fewer than 100 per year and reported that each program incorporates Indigenous knowledge and cultural traditions. The same profile stated that many AEI programs were accredited through other Ontario colleges and noted a mental health and addictions worker program delivered in partnership with Canadore College.

The Indigenous Institutes Consortium states that member institutes provide accredited programming through partnership and articulation agreements with other post-secondary institutions, while also pursuing accreditation through Indigenous and provincial quality-assurance processes. The Indigenous Advanced Education and Skills Council provides quality assurance for Indigenous Institutes in Ontario under the Indigenous Institutes Act, 2017 framework.

== See also ==
- Anishinabek Nation
- Fort William First Nation
- Munsee-Delaware Nation
- Nipissing First Nation
- Post-secondary education in Canada
