= Anishinaabe =

Indigenous ethnic groups of the United States and Canada

ᐊᓂᔑᓈᐯ
- Homelands of Anishinaabe and Anishinini, c. 1800

Regions with significant populations
- Canada (Quebec, Ontario, Manitoba); United States (Kansas, Michigan, Minnesota, North Dakota, Oklahoma, and Wisconsin)

Languages
- English, French, Ojibwe–Potawatomi languages

Religion
- Midewin, Methodism, Anishinaabe religions and others

Related ethnic groups
- Other Algonquian peoples and Métis

- Person: Anishinaabe ᐊᓂᔑᓈᐯ
- People: Anishinaabeg ᐊᓂᔑᓈᐯᒃ
- Language: Anishinaabemowin ᐊᓂᔑᓈᐯᒧᐎᓐ; Hand Talk
- Country: Anishinaabewaki ᐊᓂᔑᓈᐯᐗᑭ

The Anishinaabe (alternatively spelled Anishinabe, Anicinape, Nishnaabe, Neshnabé, Anishinaabeg, Anishinabek, and in French Anichinabé and Anichinabée) are a group of culturally related Indigenous peoples in the Great Lakes region of Canada and the United States. They include the Ojibwe (including Saulteaux and Anisininew), Odawa, Potawatomi, Mississaugas, Nipissing, and Algonquin peoples. The Anishinaabe speak Anishinaabemowin, or Anishinaabe languages that belong to the Algonquian language family.

At the time of first contact with Europeans they lived in the Northeast Woodlands and the Subarctic, and some have since spread to the Great Plains.

The word Anishinaabe means 'people from whence lowered'. Another definition is 'the good humans', meaning those who are on the right road or path given to them by the Creator Gitche Manitou, or Great Spirit. Basil Johnston, an Ojibwe historian, linguist, and writer, wrote that the term's literal translation is 'beings made out of nothing' or 'spontaneous beings'. The Anishinaabe believe that their people were created by divine breath.

The word Anishinaabe is often mistakenly considered a synonym of Ojibwe, but it refers to a much larger group of Nations.

== Name ==
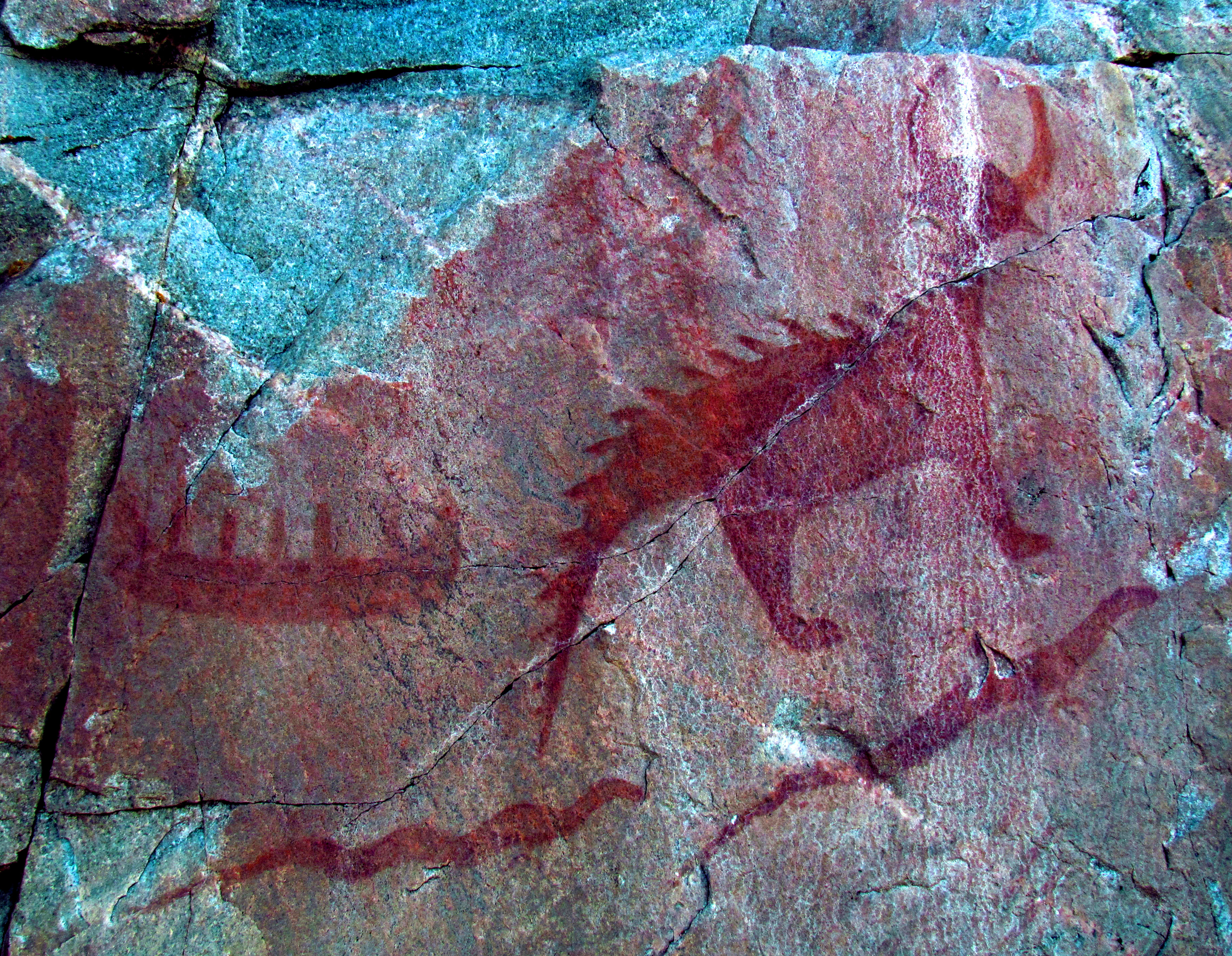
Pictograph of a canoe (top left), Mishipeshu (top right), and two giant serpents (chi'gnebikoog), panel VIII, Agawa Rock, Lake Superior Provincial Park, Ontario, Canada

Anishinaabe has many different Romanized spellings. Different spelling systems may indicate vowel length or spell certain consonants differently (Anishinabe, Anicinape); meanwhile, variants ending in -eg/ek (Anishinaabeg, Anishinabek) come from an Algonquian plural, while those ending in an -e come from an Algonquian singular.

The name Anishinaabe is sometimes shortened to Nishnaabe, mostly by Odawa people. The cognate Neshnabé comes from the Potawatomi, a people long allied with the Odawa and Ojibwe in the Council of Three Fires. The Nipissing, Mississaugas, and Algonquin are identified as Anishinaabe but are not part of the Council of Three Fires.

Closely related to the Ojibwe and speaking a language mutually intelligible with Anishinaabemowin (Anishinaabe language) is the Anisininew (also called the Oji-Cree or Severn Ojibwe). Their most common autonym is Anishinini (plural: Anishininiwag), and they call their language Anishininiimowin.

Among the Anishinaabe, the Ojibwe collectively call the Nipissings and the Algonquins Odishkwaagamii 'those who are at the end of the lake', while those among the Nipissings who identify themselves as Algonquins call the Algonquins proper Omàmiwinini 'those who are downstream'.

Not all Anishinaabemowin-speakers call themselves Anishinaabe. The Ojibwe people who migrated to what are now Canada's prairie provinces call themselves Nakawē(-k) and call their branch of the Anishinaabemowin Nakawēmowin. (The French ethnonym for the group is Saulteaux.) Particular Anishinaabe groups have different names from region to region.

== Clans ==
The Anishinaabe use of the clan system represents familial, spiritual, economic and political relations between members of their communities. Often an animal is used to represent a person's clan or dodem but plants and other spirit beings are sometimes used as well. The word dodem means 'the heart or core of a person, village or community'. There are different teachings about how many clans there are and which are clans in leadership positions. This is due to the decentralized mode of governance that the Anishinaabe practice. Each person is a self-determining authority, and it is their duty to uphold their own roles and responsibilities for the wellbeing of all our relations. This is understood as the "Law of Non-interference". Nobody can interfere with another being's path unless they are causing great harm to another or themselves.

Within the Anishinaabe governance structure there are seven leader clans that each facilitate a specific role and have responsibilities within the community and to the rest of Creation. Within each grouping of clans are seven clans. This means there are a total of 49 Anishinaabe clans.

1. Waawaakeshi (Deer)
  - Zaagi'idiwin (Love)
2. Maang (Loon)
  - Debaadendiziwin (Humility)
3. Migizi (Bald Eagle)
  - Debwewin (Truth)
4. Makwa (Bear)
  - B'Maadziwin (Good Life or Balanced Life)
5. Ajijaak (Crane)
  - Mnaadendimowin (Respect)
6. Waabizheshii (Marten)
  - Aakedhwin (Bravery)
7. Mshiikenh (Turtle)
  - Nbwaakaawin (Wisdom)

The clan system is integral to the Anishinaabe governance structure and to the Anishinaabe way of life as well as to their spiritual practices. People of the same clan are forbidden from marrying or having intimate relations as this would spell doom for the clan as a whole.

== History ==
=== Origins ===
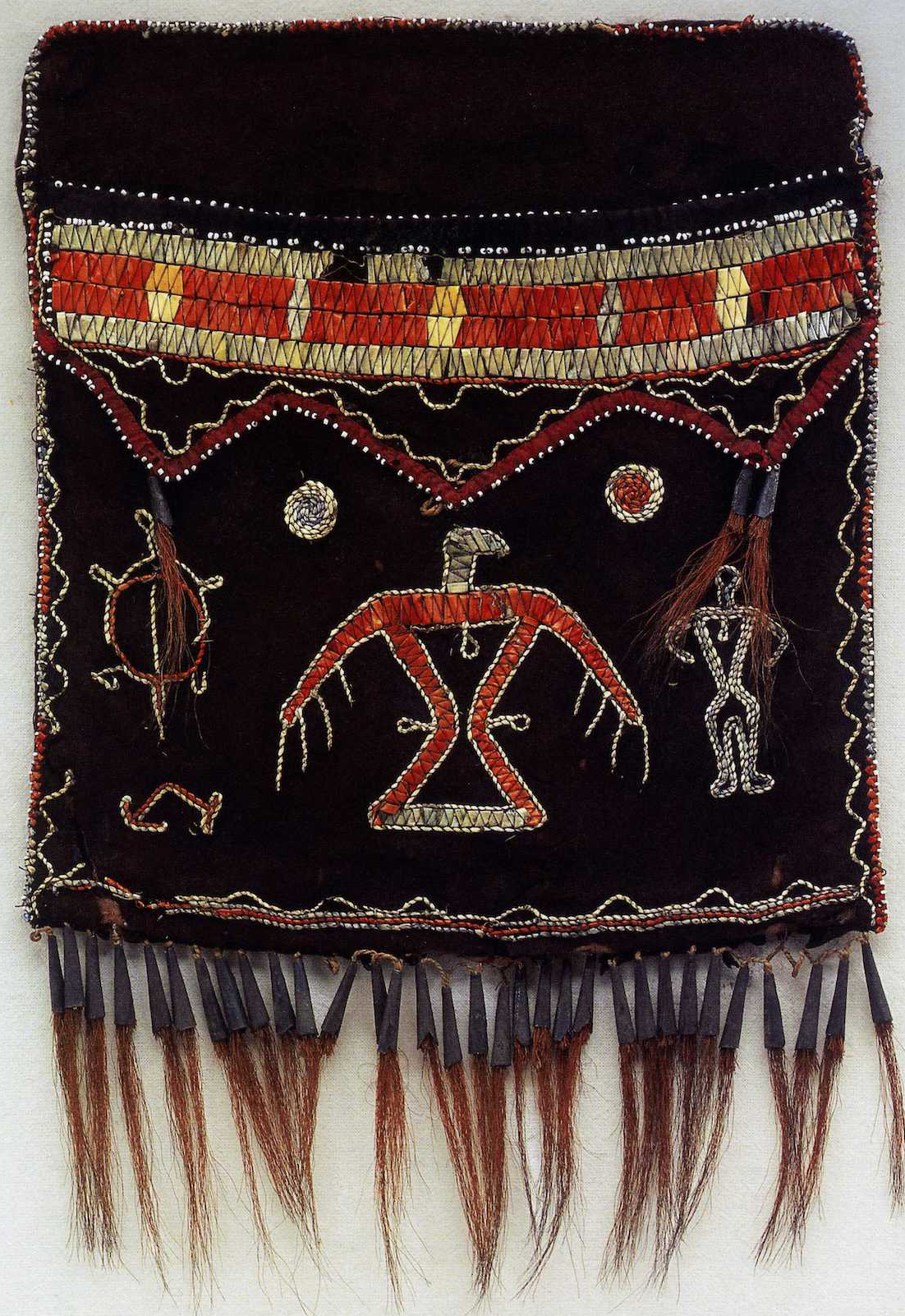
Anishinaabe shoulder bag, Ojibwa, Ontario, 1820

In Anishinaabe cultural tradition it is believed that human beings were created on the earth in four distinct places, in their own way. This is what Gizhe Mnidoo or the Creator intended. There are many versions and parts to the Creation story that tell about the creation of the cosmos, the earth, the plants, the animals and human beings. To Anishinaabe all life contains the sacred breath of life that was given by Gizhe Mnidoo and all things are animated through this sacred breath. The Anishinaabe give thanks for this gift of Creation through the burning or offering of tobacco (semaa).

Anishinaabe oral tradition and records of wiigwaasabak (birch bark scrolls) are still carried on today through the Midewewin society. These oral and written records contain the Anishinaabe creation stories as well as histories of migration that closely match other Indigenous groups of North America, such as the Hopi. Before the Anishinaabe became Anishinaabe the people migrated from Waubanaukee, an island of the East Coast, which may have been what is now called New England, as the great ice sheet receded at the end of the last ice age. This migrating group split in many different directions as they headed towards the land of the rising sun and became the many Indigenous populations that now exist on North America. After reaching the East Coast seven prophets came to the people. Each prophet delivered a specific prophecy to the people that are known as the seven fires prophecies. After the prophets delivered their messages, groups of people began to migrate westward to find the land where food grows on the water. The fulfilment of this prophecy is understood as when the Anishinaabe found the wild rice (mnoomin) or that grew on the lakes in the Great Lakes region. This is where the Anishinaabe became Anishinaabe. To the Anishinaabe, the land they encompass is still recognized as Gitchi Mikinaak or Turtle Island.

The ethnic identities of the Ojibwa, Odawa, and Potawatomi did not develop until after the Anishinaabe reached Michilimackinac on their journey westward from the Atlantic coast. Using the Midewewin scrolls, Potawatomi elder Shop-Shewana dated the formation of the Council of Three Fires to 796 AD at Michilimackinac. In this council, the Ojibwa were addressed as the "Older Brother", the Odawa as the "Middle Brother", and the Potawatomi as the "Younger Brother". Consequently, when the three Anishinaabe nations are mentioned in this specific order: Ojibwe, Odawa, and Potawatomi, it implies the Council of Three Fires as well. Each tribe had different functions: the Ojibwa were the "keepers of the faith", the Odawa the "keepers of trade," and the Potawatomi are the "keepers/maintainers of/for the fire" (boodawaadam). This was the basis for their exonyms of Boodewaadamii (Ojibwe spelling) or Bodéwadmi (Potawatomi spelling). Through the totem system (a totem is any entity which watches over or assists a group of people, such as a family, clan or tribe) and promotion of trade, the Council generally had a peaceful existence with its neighbours. However, occasional unresolved disputes erupted into wars.

The Odawa (also known as Ottawa or Outaouais) are a Native American and First Nations people. Ojibwe/Ojibwa, Chippewa, or Anishinaabemowin is the third most commonly spoken Native language in Canada (after Cree and Inuktitut). Potawatomi is a Central Algonquian language. It is spoken around the Great Lakes in Michigan and Wisconsin, as well as in the U.S. state of Kansas. In southern Ontario in Canada, it is spoken by fewer than 50 people. Though the Three Fires had several meeting places, they preferred Michilimackinac due to its central location. The Council met for military and political purposes, and maintained relations with other indigenous peoples, including both fellow Anishinaabe: the Ozaagii (Sac), Odagaamii (Meskwaki), Omanoominii (Menominee), and non-Anishinaabe: Wiinibiigoo (Ho-Chunk), Naadawe (Haudenosaunee Confederacy), Nii'inaa-Naadawe (Wyandot), Naadawensiw (Sioux), Wemitigoozhi (France), Zhaaganaashi (Britain) and the Gichi-mookomaan (the United States). The Anishinaabe communities are recognized as First Nations in Canada.

=== Relations with European settlers ===
The first of the Anishinaabe to encounter European settlers were those of the Three Fires Confederation, within the states of Wisconsin, Illinois, Indiana, Michigan, Ohio, and Pennsylvania in the territory of the present-day United States, and southern Ontario and Quebec of Canada. There were many interactions between the Anishinaabe and the European settlers; the Anishinaabe dealt with Europeans through the fur trade and as allies in European-centered conflicts. Europeans traded with the Anishinaabe for their furs in exchange for goods and also hired the Anishinaabe men as guides throughout the lands of North America. The Anishinaabe women (as well as other indigenous groups) occasionally would intermarry with fur traders and trappers. Some of their descendants would later create a Métis ethnic group. Explorers, trappers, and other European workers married or had unions with other Anishinaabe women, and their descendants tended to form a Métis culture.

==== Relationship with the French ====
The first Europeans to encounter Native Americans in the Great Lakes region were French explorers. These men were professional canoe-paddlers (voyageurs) who transported furs and other merchandise over long distances in the lake and river system of northern America. Such explorers gave French names to many places in present-day Minnesota, Michigan and Wisconsin. French settlers in the region were primarily trappers and traders and rarely established permanent settlements due to the harsh North American climate. In 1715, French military officer Constant le Marchand de Lignery constructed Fort Michilimackinac, in part to regulate relations with nearby Anishinaabe Indians.

==== Relationship with the British ====
The Anishinaabe came into contact with British colonists in the 17th and 18th centuries as they gradually expanded into the Great Lakes region as well. Since the Haudenosaunee had allied with the British Empire, the Anishinaabe fought numerous conflicts against them in conjunction with their French allies. During the French and Indian War, the majority of the Anishinaabe fought with France against the British and their Indian allies, though after Britain's victory most of them sought peace with the British. However, dissatisfaction resulting from new British policies, in particular the cancellation of the annual distribution of gifts to the Indians, led to the formation of a pan-tribal confederation, composed of several Anishinaabe peoples, to counter British control of the Ohio Country. The resulting conflict, known as Pontiac's War, resulted in a military stalemate that saw the British eventually adopting more conciliatory policies, issuing the Royal Proclamation of 1763, which forbade further white settlement across the American frontier.

After Pontiac's War, the Anishinaabe gradually established the same relationship with the British that they had with the French. During the American Revolution, which partly resulted from opposition in the Thirteen Colonies to the 1763 proclamation, the Anishinaabe (including the Three Fires Confederation) mostly sided against the rebelling colonists. Fighting in conjunction with British and Loyalist forces, the Anishinaabe fought in the Northern and Western theaters of the American Revolutionary War. After the British defeat in the Revolutionary War, the Anishinaabe mostly sought peace with the new United States, though lingering tensions resulting from encroachment by American settlers continued to spill into frequent outbreaks of violence in the frontier.

==== Relationship with the United States ====
During the Northwest Indian War and the War of 1812, the Three Fires Confederacy fought with the British against the United States. Many Anishinaabe refugees from the Revolutionary War, particularly the Odawa and Potawatomi, migrated northwards to British North America. Those who remained east of the Mississippi River were subjected to the Indian removal policy of the United States government; among the Anishinaabe, the Potawatomi were most affected by the removals. The Odawa had been removed from the migration paths of U.S. settlers, so only a handful of communities experienced removal. For the Ojibwa, removal attempts culminated in the Sandy Lake Tragedy, which resulted in several hundred deaths. The Potawatomi avoided removal only by escaping into Ojibwa-held areas and hiding from U.S. officials.

William Whipple Warren, an American man of mixed Ojibwe and European descent, became an interpreter, assistant to a trader to the Ojibwe, and legislator of the Minnesota Territory. A gifted storyteller and historian, he collected native accounts and wrote the History of the Ojibway People, Based Upon Traditions and Oral Statements, first published by the Minnesota Historical Society in 1885, some 32 years after his early death from tuberculosis. Given his Anglo-American father, Lyman Marcus Warren, and American education, the Ojibwe of the time did not consider Warren one of them. However, they retained friendly relations with him and considered him a half-brother due to his extensive knowledge of the Ojibwe language and culture and the fact that he had Ojibwe ancestry through his mixed Ojibwe-French mother, Marie Cadotte. His work covered much of the culture and history of the Ojibwe, gathered from stories of the Ojibwe Nation.

Warren identified the Crane and Loon clans as the two Chief clans among his mother's Anishinaabe people. Crane Clan was responsible for external governmental relationships, and Loon Clan was responsible for internal governance relationships. Warren believed that the policies of the U.S. government led to the destruction of indigenous clan systems along with their modes of governance when they forced indigenous people to adopt representative government and direct elections of chiefs. Furthermore, he claimed that this destruction led to many wars among the Anishinaabe. He also cited the experiences of other indigenous nations in the U.S. (such as the Muscogee, Meskwaki, and other peoples). His work was a major early work in demonstrating the significance of the clan system. After the Sandy Lake Tragedy, the U.S. government changed its policy to relocating tribes onto reservations, often by consolidating groups of communities. Conflict continued through the 19th century, as Native Americans and the United States had different goals. After the Dakota War of 1862, many Anishinaabe communities in Minnesota were relocated and further consolidated.

=== Relations with their neighbours ===
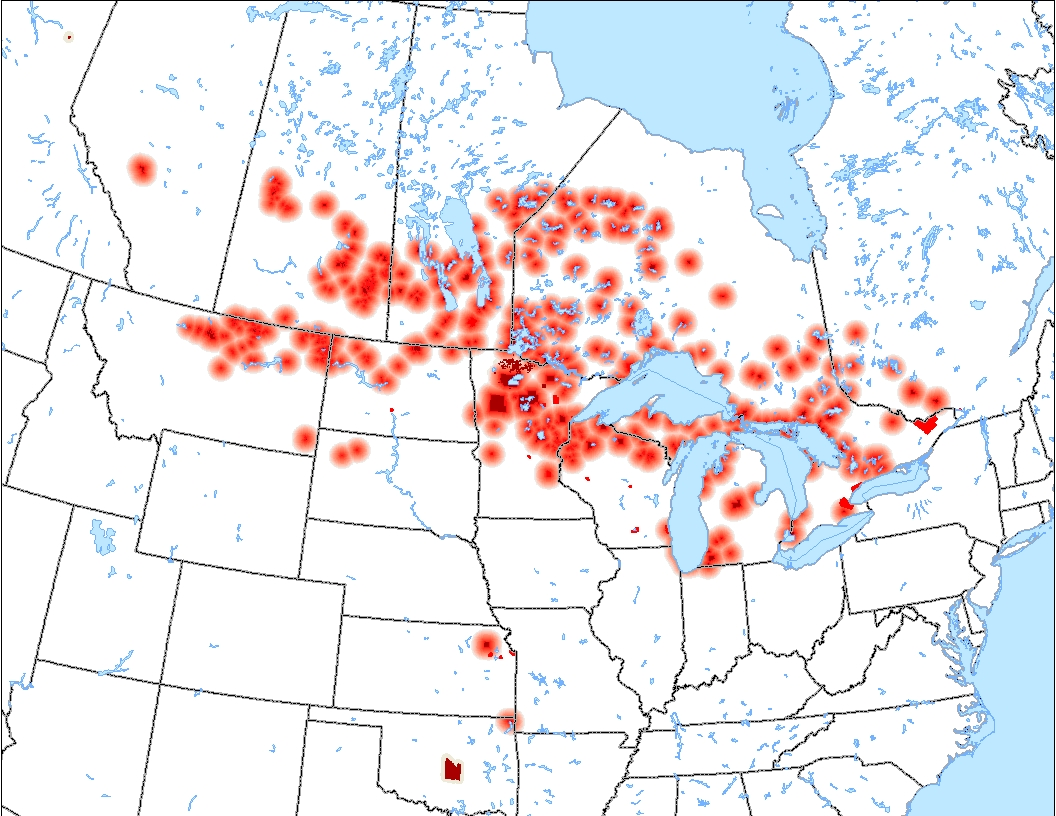
Anishinaabe Reserves/Reservations in North America, with diffusion rings if an Anishinaabe language is spoken. Cities with Anishinaabe population also shown.

==== Other indigenous groups ====
There are many Anishinaabe reserves and reservations; in some places, the Anishinaabe share some of their lands with others, such as the Cree, the Dakota, the Lenape (Delaware), and the Kickapoo, among others. The Anishnabe who "merged" with the Kickapoo tribe may now identify as being Kickapoo in Kansas and Oklahoma. The Prairie Potawatomi were the Ojibwe, Odawa, and Potawatomi of Illinois and Wisconsin who were relocated to Kansas during the 19th century.

The Anishinaabe of Manitoba, particularly those along the east side of Lake Winnipeg, have had longstanding historical conflicts with the Cree people.

==== Canada ====
In addition to other issues shared by First Nations recognized by the Canadian government and other aboriginal peoples in Canada, the Anishinaabe of Manitoba, Ontario and Quebec have opposed the Energy East pipeline of TransCanada. The Chippewas of the Thames First Nation legally challenged the right of the Canadian government to hold a pipeline hearing without their consent. The project was also the basis of a June 2015 declaration of reclaimed sovereignty over the Ottawa River valley by several Anishinaabe peoples.

==== United States ====
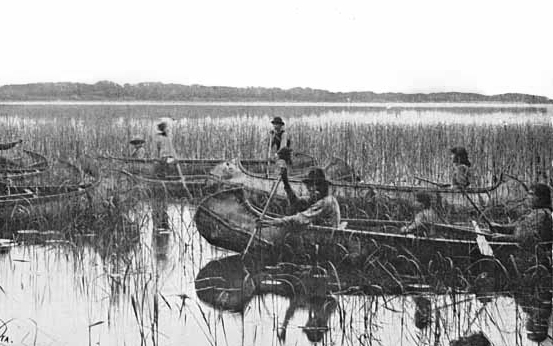
Members of the Anishinaabe nation harvesting wild rice from a lake in Brainerd, Minnesota, in the year 1905.

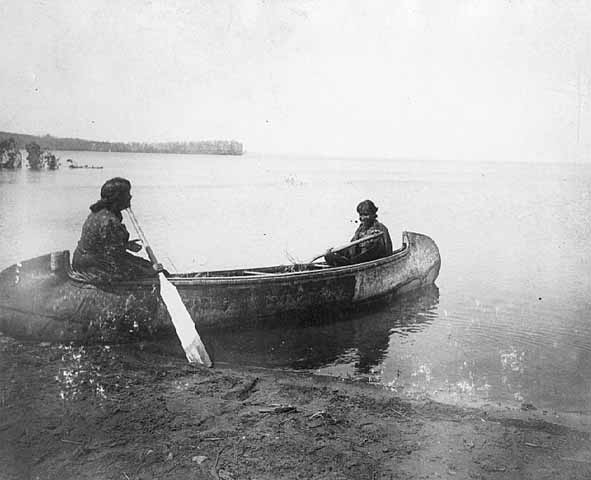
Ojibwawomen in a canoe at Leech Lake Minnesota in 1909

The relationship between the various Anishinaabe communities and the United States government has been steadily improving since the passage of the 1934 Indian Reorganization Act. Several Anishinaabe communities still experience tensions with the state governments, county governments, and non-Native American individuals and their groups.

Clan originally meant extended family. In this system originally, clans were represented by a changing cast of spokespeople at yearly meetings. In more recent times, clans have come to align personality characteristics with the animals that represent them. This shifts the focus from extended family governance to groups of people who have a particular kind of strength to offer to the community. For example, the Deer Clan is sometimes understood as having the direction of hospitality toward visitors, whereas the Crane Clan or Eagle Clan, depending on region, may be aligned with leadership qualities. Conversations surrounding how to change current systems of governance to better match how the people governed themselves over millennia are always occurring throughout Anishinaabe Aki (their home territory).

== Culture ==
=== Teachings of the Seven Grandfathers ===
The Teachings of the Seven Grandfathers are among the most commonly shared teachings in Native culture. They hold great significance to the Anishinaabe and are considered to be the founding principles of their way of life. The Seven Grandfather teachings have been around for centuries, passed on from elders through storytelling. These teachings have helped shape the way of life for the Anishinaabe for years and continue to do so. The stories can be adapted to fit specific community values and have been incorporated by organizations, schools, different programs, artists, individualists, and tribes.

==== Nibwaakaawin: Wisdom (Amik) ====
According to Anishinaabe culture, to cherish knowledge is to know wisdom. Wisdom is given by the Creator to be used for the good of the people. In Anishinaabemowin, this word expresses not only 'wisdom' but also means 'prudence, intelligence'. In some communities, Gikendaasowin is used; in addition to 'wisdom', this word can also mean 'intelligence' or 'knowledge'.

==== Zaagi'idiwin: Love (Migizi) ====
According to Anishinaabe culture, to know peace is to know love. Love must be unconditional. When people are weak they need love the most. In Anishinaabemowin, this word with the reciprocal theme idi indicates that this form of love is mutual. In some communities, Gizhaawenidiwin is used, which in most context means 'jealousy' but in this context is translated as either 'love' or 'zeal'.

==== Minaadendamowin: Respect (Shkode-bzhiki) ====
According to Anishinaabe culture, to honor all creation is to have respect. All of creation should be treated with respect. If an individual wants to be respected, they must also show respect. Some communities instead use Ozhibwaadenindiwin or Manazoonidiwin.

==== Aakode'ewin: Bravery (Makwa) ====
According to Anishinaabe culture, to be brave is to face the foe with integrity. In Anishinaabemowin, the word literally means 'state of having a fearless heart': to do what is right even when the consequences are unpleasant. Some communities instead use either Zoongadiziwin ('state of having a strong casing') or Zoongide'ewin ('state of having a strong heart').

==== Gwayakwaadiziwin: Honesty (Gaagaakshiinh/Gitchi'Sabe) ====
According to Anishinaabe culture, honesty in facing a situation is to be brave. Individuals should always be honest in word and action. If an individual is honest with themselves first, they will more easily be able to be honest with others. In Anishinaabemowin, the word can also mean 'righteousness'.

==== Dabaadendiziwin: Humility (Maa'iingan) ====
According to Anishinaabe culture, humility requires recognizing oneself as a sacred part of Creation, neither better nor worse than any other creation. In Anishinaabemowin, the word can also mean 'compassion'. Some communities instead express this with Bekaadiziwin, which in addition to 'humility' can also be translated as 'calmness, meekness, gentility, patience'.

==== Debwewin: Truth (Mshiikenh/Mikinak) ====
According to Anishinaabe culture, truth is knowing all of these things. Individuals should speak the truth and not deceive themselves or others.

=== Storytelling ===
The Anishinaabe follow an oral storytelling tradition. Storytelling serves as an integral part of Anishinaabe culture as "stories teach the stock of wisdom and knowledge found in the culture" and "promotes 'respectful individualism," wherein individuals do not force their thinking upon others. Instead of directly teaching right and wrong, the Anishinaabe often use storytelling to share their history and cultural truths, including but not limited to the Teachings of the Seven Grandfathers. Stories often "provide important lessons for living and give life purpose, value, and meaning." They can further "include religious teachings, metaphysical links, cultural insights, history, linguistic structures, literary and aesthetic form, and Indigenous 'truths'." By understanding traditional stories, individuals can better understand themselves, their world, where they came from, and where they are going.

Storytelling is situational, meaning that storytellers must be mindful of audience, of listener, and [should] keep the oration accessible and real." When a story is shared, "[t]he teller and the listener are equally activie; the listener is not passive." Furthermore, stories told are not static: "Once they become public, people will play will them, embellish them, and add to them ... There is no need for any particular story to have any particular form. Nor is it the case that any one story can ever be said to have achieved its final form. Instead, all stories are works in progress."

Before telling a story, Elders "very often begin by quoting the authority of Elders who have gone before. They do not state the authority as coming from themselves. They will say things like, 'This is what they used to say,' or 'This is what they said.'"

Beyond sharing cultural knowledge, storytelling traditions can help provide Anishinaabe children "with the intellectual tools necessary to exercise authority." The Anishinaabe see the act of allowing children to share stories as "an act of empowerment." This action "recognizes that even children have something to contribute, and encourages them to do so."

Stories are typically shared throughout the winter when there is less to do and the animals are sleeping.

==== Trickster ====
The Trickster is a common character in Anishinaabe storytelling and goes by many names, including Coyote, Raven, Wesakejac, Nanabozho, and Glooscap. They appear in many forms and genders. Stories involving the Trickster "often use humour, self-mocking, and absurdity to carry good lessons."

The Trickster helps teach cultural lessons by "learning lessons the 'hard' way." Within such stories, "Trickster often gets into trouble by ignoring cultural rules and practices or by giving sway to the negative aspects of 'humanness' ... Trickster seems to learn lessons the hard way and sometimes not at all." Contrary to some depictions of Trickster figures, the Trickster in Anishinaabe stories "has the ability to do good things for others and is sometimes like a powerful spiritual being and [is] given much respect." Stories involving the Trickster serve to "remind us about the good power of interconnectedness within family, community, nation, culture, and land. If we become disconnected, we lose the ability to make meaning from Indigenous stories."

=== Before the 1800s ===
Before the arrival of the Europeans, and until at least the 1800s, many Anishinaabe were subsistence farmers. For example, the Odawa, centered in Michilimackinac, grew corn in the summers and generally moved south in smaller family groups in the winters to hunt game. They tapped sugar maples in the spring, and moved back to the main villages to prepare for the lake sturgeon spawning season and planting.

They were renowned for their skills at making and using canoes and traded widely.

Their kinship was patrilineal and most Anishinaabe doodemag enforced exogamy, the wife keeping and representing her father's doodem while her children would take on their father's doodem. For the first few years of a marriage, a husband would live with his wife's family, and then they would typically return to the husband's people. As a result, many Anishinaabe villages included people speaking different languages not only from different clans, but also from entirely different peoples, such as the Wendat and even occasionally Sioux.

=== Symbols and flags ===
The thunderbird is a common symbol used to represent the Anishinaabe. In the 1970s, Nicholas R. Deleary of Chippewas of the Thames created a logo for what was then the Union of Ontario Indians. This logo features a black thunderbird in profile with an X-shaped body, in a circle. The Union of Ontario Indians later became the Anishinabek Nation. A variant of the logo using a red background was officially adopted in 1980. Both the white background and red background designs have been used as pan-Anishinaabe flags. Different Anishinaabe political organizations have their own specific flags and emblems.

== Education ==
In June 1994, the Chiefs at the Anishinabek Grand Council gathering at Rocky Bay First Nation, directed that the Education Directorate formally establish the Anishinabek Education Institute (AEI) in accordance with the post-secondary education model that was submitted and ratified with provisions for satellite campuses and a community-based delivery system. (Res. 94/13)

In August 2017, the Anishinabek Nation in Ontario and the government of Canada signed an agreement allowing the Anishinabek Nation to control the classroom curriculum and school resources of its kindergarten-to-grade-12 education system in 23 communities.

Approximately 8% of Anishinabek students attend schools on-reserve.

== See also ==
- Anishinaabe tribal political organizations
- L'Arbre Croche, Odawa settlement from Michilimackinac to Little Traverse Bay
- Anishinaabe Shoulder Bag
