= L'Anse Indian Reservation =

L'Anse Indian Reservation Gakiiwe’onaning Keweenaw Bay Indian Community
- Indian reservation
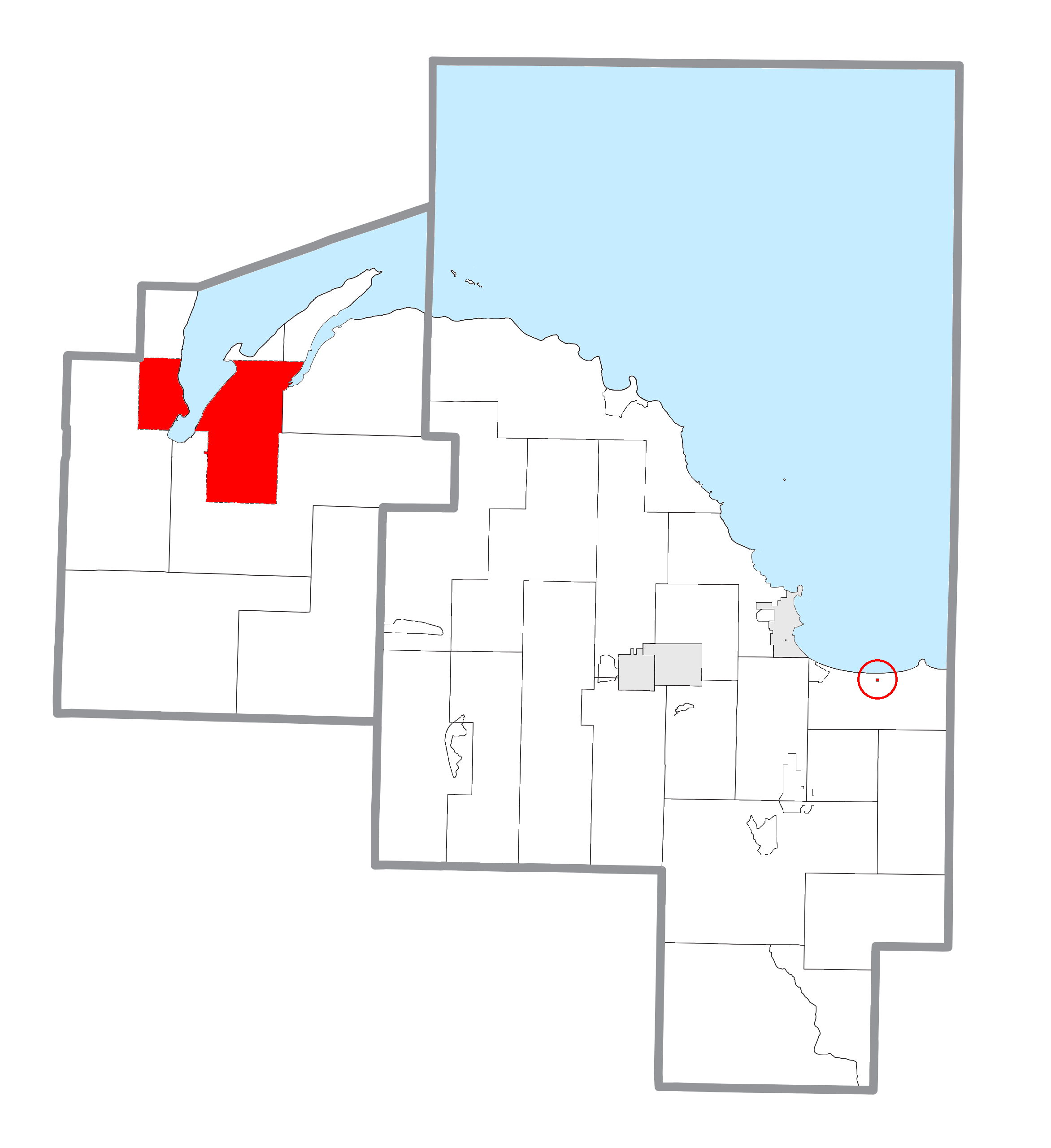
- Locations within Baraga County (left) and Marquette County (right)

- Location within the State of Michigan
- Coordinates: 46°46′36″N 88°29′46″W
- Country: United States
- State: Michigan
- Counties: Baraga and Marquette
- Established: 1854
- Re-establishment: 1934 (tribal government)

Government
  - Governing Body: Tribal Council of the Keweenaw Bay Indian Community
  - President: Everett Ekdahl, Jr.
  - Vice President: Tony Loonsfoot

Area
  - Total: 110.06 sq mi (285.1 km^{2})
  - Land: 91.98 sq mi (238.2 km^{2})
  - Water: 18.08 sq mi (46.8 km^{2}) 16.4%
- (includes off-reservation trust land)

Population (2020)
  - Total: 3,396
  - Density: 37/sq mi (14.3/km^{2})
- (includes off-reservation trust land)
- Time zone: UTC-5 (Eastern (EST))
  - Summer (DST): UTC-4 (EDT)
- Website: http://www.kbic-nsn.gov/

Keweenaw Bay Indian Community
Total population
- Enrolled members: 3,159 (1999)

Regions with significant populations
- United States (Michigan)

Languages
- English, Ojibwe

Religion
- Christianity

Related ethnic groups
- Odawa, Potawatomie

Map showing Indian Reservations in Michigan.

The L'Anse Indian Reservation is the land base of the federally recognized Keweenaw Bay Indian Community (Ojibwe: Gakiiwe’onaning) of the historic Lake Superior Band of Chippewa Indians. (The Keweenaw Bay Indian Community was defined in 1934 by the Indian Reorganization Act as the successor apparent of the L’Anse and Ontonagon bands). The reservation is located primarily in two non-contiguous sections on either side of the Keweenaw Bay in Baraga County in the Upper Peninsula of the U.S. state of Michigan. The Keweenaw Bay Community also manages the separate Ontonagon Indian Reservation.

As of 2020, the L'Anse reservation had a land area of 91.98 square miles (58,870 acres; 238.2 km^{2}), including off-reservation trust land. The population living on the reservation was 3,396 in the 2020 census. Most of the village of Baraga and part of the village of L'Anse are on reservation land. In 1999, tribal enrollment was 3,159 according to the Bureau of Indian Affairs 1999 Labor Force Report.

== History ==
This area was historically the territory of the L'Anse Band of the Lake Superior Band of Chippewa Indians, a large, decentralized group of loosely associated bands around southern Lake Superior.

The European-American community of L'Anse developed around a French fur trading post set up in colonial times at the site of an Ojibwa village on the bay. It continued to develop after the British took control of New France following the Seven Years' War. After the War of 1812 between Britain and the United States, negotiations settled the border with Canada, and this area became part of the United States.

As European-American settlers moved into Michigan in the early 19th century, the United States increased pressure on the Lake Superior Band of Ojibwa to cede their lands to allow unrestricted development. The Treaty of 1842, by which the Chippewa ceded lands to the federal government, was one of the largest land cession agreements ever made between the U.S. federal government and Indian tribes. It includes provisions and stipulations that the Chippewa retain their rights to fish, hunt and gather on these ceded lands.

The L’Anse Reservation is both the oldest and largest reservation in Michigan. It was established under the Chippewa Treaty of 1854. The United States Supreme Court has interpreted this treaty as creating permanent homelands for the Chippewa (Ojibwa Anishnaabeg) band signatories to the treaty. The US ultimately acquired land and set up other reservations in Michigan for Chippewa based on this treaty, for instance for the Bay Mills Indian Community.

Seven hundred and sixty acres (310 ha) of forestland was transferred from The Nature Conservancy to the Keweenaw Bay Indian Community in 2024. The land, located within the ’s 1842 reservation boundary, was purchased from a landowner in 2021.

== Geography ==
The reservation includes land on either side of the Keweenaw Bay in Baraga County, Michigan. The entire reservation encompasses nearly one third of the area of Baraga County. The largest section lies in northern L'Anse Township and western Arvon Township on the east side of Keweenaw Bay, while the smaller section lies in northern Baraga Township on the west side of Keweenaw Bay. There is also a much smaller (43.07 acre) part of the reservation in northern Chocolay Township in northeastern Marquette County.

According to the United States Census Bureau, the L'Anse reservation and off-reservation trust land have a combined total area of 110.06 square miles (285.1 km^{2}), of which 91.98 square miles (58,870 acres; 238.2 km^{2}) is land and 18.08 square miles (46.8 km^{2}) is water. Of the total area, 0.14 square miles (90 acres; 0.36 km^{2}) was off-reservation trust land.

Due to historic allotment under the Dawes Act of 1886, only about 36% of the land inside the reservation is owned by the Keweenaw Bay Indian Community. The remaining 64% is owned by individuals (both Tribal members and non-members), businesses, and other local governments.

== Reservation demographics ==
As of the census of 2020, the population of the L'Anse Reservation (including off-reservation trust land) was 3,396. The population density was 36.9 inhabitants per square mile (14.2/km^{2}). There were 1,844 housing units at an average density of 20.0 per square mile (7.7/km^{2}). The racial makeup of the reservation and off-reservation trust land was 58.6% White, 29.3% Native American, 0.1% Black or African American, 0.6% from other races, and 11.3% from two or more races. Ethnically, the population was 1.1% Hispanic or Latino of any race.

== Government ==
The Keweenaw Bay Indian Community re-established its tribal government under the Indian Reorganization Act of 1934, with its constitution for elected government adopted in 1936. It elects members to a tribal council and executive.

The Act, which encouraged tribes to reorganize their self-governments, also required that the Ontonagon and L'Anse bands of the Lake Superior Band of Chippewa Indians be brought together as the federally recognized Keweenaw Bay Indian Community, defining it as the successor apparent of these two historic bands. Each had reservations in Michigan established through 19th-century treaties with the federal government.

The Keweenaw Bay Community was among the four founding tribes of the Inter-Tribal Council of Michigan, Inc. established in 1966 during a period of rising Indian activism in the United States and Canada. Others were the Bay Mills Indian Community, Hannahville Indian Community, and Saginaw Chippewa Indian Tribe; all were federally recognized at the time. They worked to pool resources, preserve communal land, improve the welfare of their peoples, and improve relations with state and federal governments. Working as a group, the tribes qualified for Community Action Program grants that helped fund improvements in living conditions for their peoples. The council now represents 11 of the 12 federally recognized tribes in Michigan.

The Keweenaw Bay Indian Community establishes its own membership rules for the tribe.

== Economy ==
The Keweenaw Indian Community operates a fish hatchery at Pequamining Bay on Lake Superior. It works to improve and preserve water quality in the lake to support fish and other natural populations.

The tribe also operates two casinos, the Ojibwa I on reservation land in Baraga County, and the Ojibwa II in a residential neighborhood in Chocolay Township, Marquette County. A 2000 land claims settlement with the state required the tribe to relocate the latter casino. The tribe proposed moving it to the defunct Marquette County Airport. As of December 2012 the location remained unsettled.

== Communities ==
- Baraga (most)
- L'Anse (part)
- Zeba

== Media ==
WGLI is owned and operated by the tribe.
