= Portage College =

Community college in Alberta, Canada

- Former names: Alberta Vocational College; Pe-Te-Pun (New Dawn)
- Motto: Building success by delivering exceptional learning experiences.
- Type: public community college
- Established: 1968
- Affiliations: CICan, CCAA, AACTI
- Chairman: Randolph Benson
- President: Dr. Stephen Price
- Students: 1,615 (2023-24 fulltime equivalent)
- Undergraduates: available – 1st & 2nd year university transfer
- Location: Lac La Biche, Alberta, Canada; 54.76599°N 111.96862°W
- Campus: urban; suburban; rural; remote
- Colours: Teal and Purple
- Mascot: Eddy Rocks the Voyageur
- Website: www.portagecollege.ca

Portage College is a public board-governed community college in Lac La Biche, Alberta, Canada. Portage has seven campus locations throughout northeastern Alberta.

== History ==
In 1968, Alberta NewStart was established in Lac La Biche as part of the federal government's initiative to research basic adult education. NewStart offered instruction in areas as diverse as academic upgrading, trapping, wild fur management, and oilfield management. However, after several months the government decided to close the facility and cease the research. A group of Aboriginal students faced with the pending closure of their school decided to challenge the government by staging a sit-in. The group was successful, and the government awarded a grant to continue the NewStart program. The school took on a new name “Pe-Ta-Pun” meaning “New Dawn.”

In 1973, the Alberta government took over the program, reopening it as the province's fifth Alberta Vocational Centre. From 1973 to 1980 programs and services expanded to include community-based programs. In 1980, the Minister of Advanced Education announced plans to replace the vocational centre's temporary facilities with a new campus, which was opened in 1985. A board of governors was established for the college in 1998 and the following year the Minister of Advanced Education and Career Development approved a change of name to “Portage College.”

== Locations ==
The main campus is located in Lac La Biche, Alberta and regional service centres are located in Cold Lake and St. Paul. Additional campuses are found in Goodfish Lake, Frog Lake, Saddle Lake, and Boyle.

== Programs ==
Portage College offers over 30 certificate and diploma programs, career programs, trades and technical, academic upgrading, business, university studies, human services, health and wellness and native arts and culture. Continuing education is offered in the fields of business, university studies, human services, health and wellness, native arts and culture, trades and technical careers.

== Museum of Aboriginal Peoples' Art and Artifacts ==
The museum is housed at the Portage College Corporate Centre and contains nearly 2000 Indigenous artworks and artifacts. The exhibits provide an in-depth look at North American Aboriginal Art from First Nations, Métis and Inuit cultures. Since 2018 the museum houses a permanent collection of the Professional Native Indian Artists Inc. (Daphne Odjig, Alex Janvier, Joseph Sánchez, Norval Morrisseau, Eddy Cobiness, Carl Ray and Jackson Beardy).

== Athletics ==
Portage College is home to seven collegiate teams including men's and women's soccer, men's and women's futsal, men's hockey, golf and curling. The teams compete in the Alberta Colleges Athletic Conference, consisting of teams throughout Alberta and Saskatchewan.

Voyageur curling, soccer, futsal and hockey games/practices are held at the Bold Center in Lac La Biche, a 233,000 square foot facility.

Voyageur Golf is played at the Lac La Biche Golf & Country Club.

The College Team logo depicts the traditional voyageur that used to travel on the lakes and rivers of northeastern Alberta. Team colours are red and navy blue.

== Honorary graduates ==
The following have been given honorary degrees from Portage College for their work in the community and their continued promotion of the college.

Name	Distinction	Year
Bill Hunter	Business Diploma	2004
Floyd Thompson	Honorary Parchment	2005
Elsie Quintal	Native Cultural Arts Certificate	2006
Jan Reimer	Women's Shelter Crisis Worker Diploma	2007
Lawrence Spence	Human Services Diploma	2008
Ray Coates	Honorary Parchment	2009
Hon. Ray Danyluk	Business and Community Development Diploma	2009
Norm Quinney	Diploma	2010
Chief James Jackson Jr.	Diploma	2010
John Irwin	Honorary Parchment	2011
Gerald and Randy Wowk	Honorary Parchment	2012
Ted Langford	Business/Community Development Diploma	2013
John Borders	Honorary Parchment	2014
Uta Squire	Early Learning and Child Care	2015
Elder David McGilvery	Artisan Entrepreneurship Diploma	2016
June Cardinal-Howse	Honorary Business Diploma	2017
Myrna Fox	Early Learning and Child Care/Educational Assistant Diploma	2018
Rosalie Halfe	Honorary Parchment Community Development	2019
Rennie Houle	Honorary Parchment Community Development	2019
NA	Postponed due to COVID-19 Pandemic	2020
Bill Britton	Honorary Parchment Community Development	2021
Kalan Britton	Honorary Parchment Community Development	2021
Lorraine Quinney	Honorary Parchment Community Development	2022
Shirley Moocheweinies	Honorary Parchment Community Development	2022
Ruby Stone	Honorary Parchment Community Development	2023
Emma Rayko	Honorary Parchment Community Development	2024
Tammy Janvier	Honorary Parchment Community Development	2024
Ian Thompson	Honorary Parchment Community Development	2025
Rhonda Jackson	Honorary Parchment Business Administration Management	2025
Tom Jackson	Honorary Parchment Business Administration Management	2025

== See also ==
- List of universities and colleges in Alberta
- Education in Alberta
