= Michelle LaVallee =

Canadian curator, artist, and educator

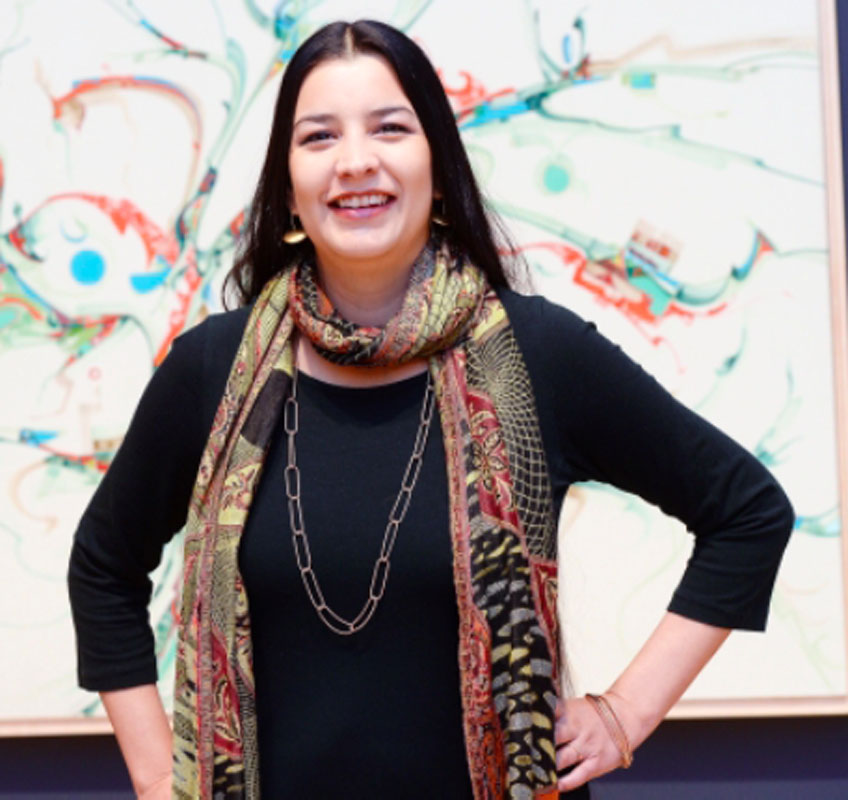
- Born: Michelle LaVallee; October 26, 1977 (age 48); Newmarket, Ontario, Canada
- Education: York University
- Known for: Acrylic paint, mixed media

Michelle LaVallee is a Canadian curator, artist, and educator. She is Ojibway and a member of the Chippewas of Nawash Unceded First Nation in Cape Croker, Ontario. She has BFA (2000) and BEd (2004) degrees from York University in Toronto.

LaVallee's most recent degree is an MA in Art History and Curatorial Studies from the University of Regina in Regina, Saskatchewan, with a special focus on the complex, contextual, and interactive nature of Aboriginal curatorial practices in the development of curatorial and art historical research models. She has been the curator at the MacKenzie Art Gallery in Regina, Saskatchewan since 2007. Lavallee won the award for Excellence in Arts Related Service at the Mayors' Arts and Business Awards in Regina, Saskatchewan in 2013. Activating and developing greater understanding of misrepresented or marginalized histories is of personal and political import for LaVallee whose critical thought is influenced from her experience working with Indigenous peoples in Canada, El Salvador, Australia and Aotearoa (New Zealand).

== Curatorial practice ==
LaVallee began her curatorial practice in 2005 at Aspace gallery in Toronto. She served as curator at the MacKenzie Art Gallery in Regina, Saskatchewan from 2007 to 2017. Since 2017, she worked at the Indigenous and Northern Affairs Canada Art Centre, in Gatineau, Quebec.

LaVallee’s curatorial work explores how colonial relations have shaped historical and contemporary culture in Canada. She has curated several shows exploring narratives resistance to colonialism, including 7: Professional Native Indian Artists Inc., a retrospective exhibition of the Professional Native Indian Artists Inc., which featured First Nations artists Jackson Beardy, Eddy Cobiness, Alex Janvier, Norval Morrisseau, Daphne Odjig, Carl Ray, and Joseph Sanchez. The exhibition celebrated the first incorporated First Nations artist organization in Canada. These artists met in the 1970s and demanded to be recognized as professional contemporary artists. The exhibition opened at the MacKenzie Art Gallery in Regina, Saskatchewan on September 21, 2013, and was accompanied by a catalogue titled 7: Professional Native Indian Artists Inc, which won three 2015 Saskatchewan Book Awards The exhibition travelled to the Winnipeg Art Gallery in Winnipeg, Manitoba (May 9 to August 31, 2014); Kelowna Art Gallery in Kelowna, British Columbia (October 11, 2014 to January 4, 2015); and the McMichael Canadian Art Collection in Kleinburg, Ontario (May 10 to August 16, 2015).

The Canadian Aboriginal Curators Delegation selected LaVallee to attend 2015 Asia Pacific Triennial in Brisbane, the 2011 Venice Biennale, and the 2010 and 2008 Biennale of Sydney. In 2006, the Canada Council gave her the Arts Assistance to Aboriginal Curators Grant for Residencies in the Visual Arts. In 2013, she spoke at the University of Manitoba's School of Art 100th Anniversary Symposium, which had a theme of Indigenizing the Campus Through Art.

== Studio art ==
LaVallee paints in acrylics and mixed media. Her experimental three-dimensional works incorporate materials culturally significant to Anishinaabeg. An installation she debuted in Ottawa in 2007 has since toured. LaVallee's visual work of customary Native iconography has been in several group exhibitions across Canada.

== Selected curatorial projects ==
- 2015: Moving Forward, Never Forgetting (Co-Curator), MacKenzie Art Gallery, Regina, Saskatchewan
- 2013: 7 Professional Native Indian Artists Inc., Mackenzie Art Gallery
- 2012: 13 Coyotes: Edward Poitras, Mackenzie Art Gallery
- 2009: Blow Your House In: Vernon Ah Kee, Mackenzie Art Gallery
- 2008: Wally Dion, Mackenzie Art Gallery
- 2008: Miss Chief: Shadow Catcher – Kent Monkman, Mackenzie Art Gallery
- 2007: Re/translation: Land & Language, A Space, Toronto, Ontario

== Exhibitions ==
- 2012: Changing Hands: Art Without Reservation 3, Museum of Arts and Design, New York City, New York
- 2010: Love, Saskatchewan, Harbourfront Centre, Toronto, Ontario
- 2009: Flatlanders: Saskatchewan Artists on the Horizon, Mendel Art Gallery, Saskatoon, Saskatchewan
- 2008: Myths of the Land, Ottawa Art Gallery, Ottawa, Ontario (show included art from members of the Professional Native Indian Artists Inc.

== Sources ==
- "7: Professional Native Indian Artists Inc." MacKenzie Art Gallery. Retrieved 28-02-2016.
- Commanda, Erica. (09-02-2015). "THE INDIGENOUS GROUP OF SEVEN." Muskrat Magazine. Retrieved 28-02-2016.
