= Eddy Cobiness =

Canadian painter

- Born: July 17, 1933; Warroad, Minnesota, United States
- Died: January 1, 1996 (aged 62); Winnipeg, Manitoba, Canada
- Education: Self-taught
- Known for: Painter
- Movement: Woodland School of Art and Indian Group of Seven.

"Nesting Goose" by Eddy Cobiness, ink & watercolor, 1980 screen print. An example of his "Woodland School of Art" works.

Eddy Cobiness (July 17, 1933 – January 1, 1996) was a Canadian artist. He was an Ojibwe-Native Canadian and his art work is characterized by scenes from the life outdoors and nature. He began with realistic scenes and then evolved into more abstract work. He belonged to the "Woodland School of Art" and was a prominent member of the "Professional Native Indian Artists Incorporation", better known as the "Indian Group of Seven". He was a graphic designer who began drawing pictures of birds in sand, snow or on cardboard, in his childhood. In the 1950s, during his military service years, he discovered working in watercolour. He studied colour and composition. In the 1960s his ink and watercolour drawings were commercially successful, and he began his art career. For Cobiness, the life outdoors and nature always was subject of his works. He began with realistic scenes and then evolve into more abstract work, influenced by his art colleague at the time, painter Benjamin Chee Chee. He further developed his work unimpeded and worked with several styles, using many media. It would bring him international recognition. It is known that Queen Elizabeth II has work of Cobiness in her collection. Cobiness died in Winnipeg, Manitoba, on January 1, 1996, of complications from diabetes.

== Life ==
Cobiness grew up on Buffalo Point First Nation's Indian reserve in southeast Manitoba. Cobiness belongs to the "Indian Group of Seven" along with Jackson Beardy, Alex Janvier, Norval Morrisseau, Daphne Odjig, Carl Ray and Joseph Sanchez. Through a united effort the group created a niche for First Nations Artists in the Canadian Art landscape.

== Family ==
Cobiness had a wife named Helen and 9 children.
