= Jackson Beardy =

First Nations artist

- Born: July 24, 1944; Garden Hill Reserve, Island Lake, Manitoba, Canada
- Died: December 7, 1984 (aged 40); Winnipeg, Manitoba, Canada
- Education: Self-taught, Technical Vocational High School, University of Manitoba
- Known for: Painter
- Notable work: Treaty Numbers 23, 287, 1171
- Movement: Woodland School of Art and Indian Group of Seven.
- Awards: Canadian Centennial Medal (1972), Young Achievers Award, Canada Council Grant, Outstanding Young Manitoban Award

Jackson Beardy (July 24, 1944 – December 7, 1984) was an Indigenous Anisininew artist born in Canada. His works are characterized by scenes from Ojibwe and Cree oral history and many focus on the relationship between humans and nature. He belonged to the Woodland School of Art and was a prominent member of the Indian Group of Seven. His work has contributed to the recognition of Indigenous contemporary art within Canada.

== Early life and education ==
Jackson Beardy was born July 24, 1944. He was the son of John Beardy and Dinah Monias and fifth of 13 children. Beardy's father supported the family as a trapper, hunter, pedlar, gold miner, fisherman and fish filleter. The Beardys lived in a single-roomed log cabin but despite the lack of material goods, John Beardy provided the necessities and Beardy appears to have had a happy childhood. He lived with his grandmother, from whom he learned the oral traditions and legends of his Anishinaabe ancestors, for most of his childhood.

Beardy attended residential school at Portage la Prairie in Southern Manitoba at the age of seven. Here, he was separated from his sister and could not communicate with her during the school years. Before attending the school, he did not speak English. Beardy quickly distanced himself from the forced nature of education that all Indigenous peoples in that area underwent at the residential schools, and it was from these lessons that he began to assert his Indigenous culture. Beardy's reaction to the mental de-structuring process at the school was to become the school wit. It was at the residential school that he learned how to draw and paint. A kind school teacher, Mary Morris, encouraged Beardy's art and stayed in touch with Beardy after he left the school. When drawing at the school, he was not permitted to visually express the Anishinaabe oral narratives.

At the age of 16, the authorities allowed the students to leave the school, however the principal of the residential school promised Beardy an art education if he stayed two more years to gain his high school certificate. Beardy then chose to stay another two years. At the age of 18, Beardy approached the principal to ask for the promised art education, but quickly learned that the principal would not allow him the art education after all. The principal did not believe that being an artist would make Beardy a "decent" citizen. Instead, he offered Beardy a course in commercial art, since this would be more economically sustainable. When learning this, young Beardy angrily told him, that he would show him that he is capable of becoming an artist.

During his last year in high school, his grades began to fall and Beardy turned to alcoholism. After failing high school, Beardy still wished to pursue an art education; he completed the failed courses and was accepted into a course on commercial art. He completed these courses at Technical Vocational High School and graduated in 1964. Subsequently, Beardy completed his education at the School of Art at the University of Manitoba in 1966.

== Art career ==
Jackson Beardy's first solo exhibition was in 1965 at the University of Winnipeg. He had many subsequent solo exhibitions throughout 1960s and 1970s. In 1967, Beardy was commissioned to create pieces to commemorate the Canadian centennial. That same year he was invited to serve as consultant for the "Canadian Indian Pavilion" at Expo 67.

In 1972, Jackson Beardy, Alex Janvier, and Daphne Odjig held a joint exhibition at the Winnipeg Art Gallery titled "Treaty Numbers 23, 287, 1171". The name of the piece was a reference to the numbered treaties that were negotiated with the Canadian government of each artist's band. From this 1973 exhibition, a group of Indigenous artists formed the "Professional Native Indian Artists Association", better known as the "Indian Group of Seven". Included alongside Jackson Beardy was Alex Janvier, Norval Morrisseau, Daphne Odjig, Carl Ray, Eddy Cobiness and Joseph Sanchez. They collaborated to move their work toward larger mainstream acceptance. They committed to maintaining Indigenous control over Indigenous works of art and emphasized artistic rather than anthropological value.

From 1974 through 1976, Beardy contributed artwork to the covers of numerous books including Ojibway Heritage by Basil Johnston, When the Morning Stars Sang Together by John Morgan, and Almighty Voice by Leonard Peterson. Also in 1976, Beardy was one of the contributing artists for a Royal Ontario Museum exhibit called, "Contemporary Native Art of Canada: The Woodland Indians" which travelled to Germany and England.

In 1977, Beardy had an exhibition in Vancouver, BC entitled, "Images for a Canadian Heritage".

From 1982 through 1983, Jackson Beardy was senior arts advisor for the Federal Department of Indian Affairs and Northern Development, now known as Indian and Northern Affairs Canada. He developed the "Indian Fine Arts Guide" which outlined procedures for the acquisition of Indigenous art. Additionally during this time, he held the position of art advisor and cultural consultant for the Manitoba Museum of Man and Nature.

In 1984, Beardy was commissioned to paint a mural at the intersection of Selkirk and Powers in Winnipeg. The paintings were to depict "Peace and Harmony" but Beardy died before he could complete it. It was completed posthumously by students from R.B. Russell Vocational High School. The piece was revealed on September 5, 1985.

In celebration of his body of work, Beardy's art was shown at the Winnipeg Art Gallery from 1993 to 1994. It was again shown in 1995, in an exhibit called "Jackson Beardy: A Life's Work" at the Thunder Bay Art Gallery. Beardy's artwork has been displayed in many museums and other notable institutions both domestically and internationally.

== Art style ==
Beardy, as well as other members from the Professional Native Indian Artists Incorporated, was a member of the Woodlands School of Indigenous Art. This Woodlands style of artistic expression can be seen in the central role Beardy's Anishinaabe heritage plays within his work. Using a variety of supports, such as canvas, birch bark, and beaver skins, Beardy's artwork often showcases traditional figures from Ojibwe and Cree oral traditions. His art draws on a deep knowledge of his native Cree tradition gained from a close childhood relationship with his grandmother and from his systematic collection of myths and legends in northern Manitoba.

His distinctive graphic style contrasts precise, black outlines with defined areas of rich colour. His art expresses fundamental cosmological and spiritual concepts such as balance in nature, regeneration and growth, and the interdependence of humans and nature.

== Death ==
Jackson Beardy died on December 7, 1984, in Winnipeg, Manitoba from complications after a heart attack.
