= Woodlands style =

Indigenous art movement originating in Canada

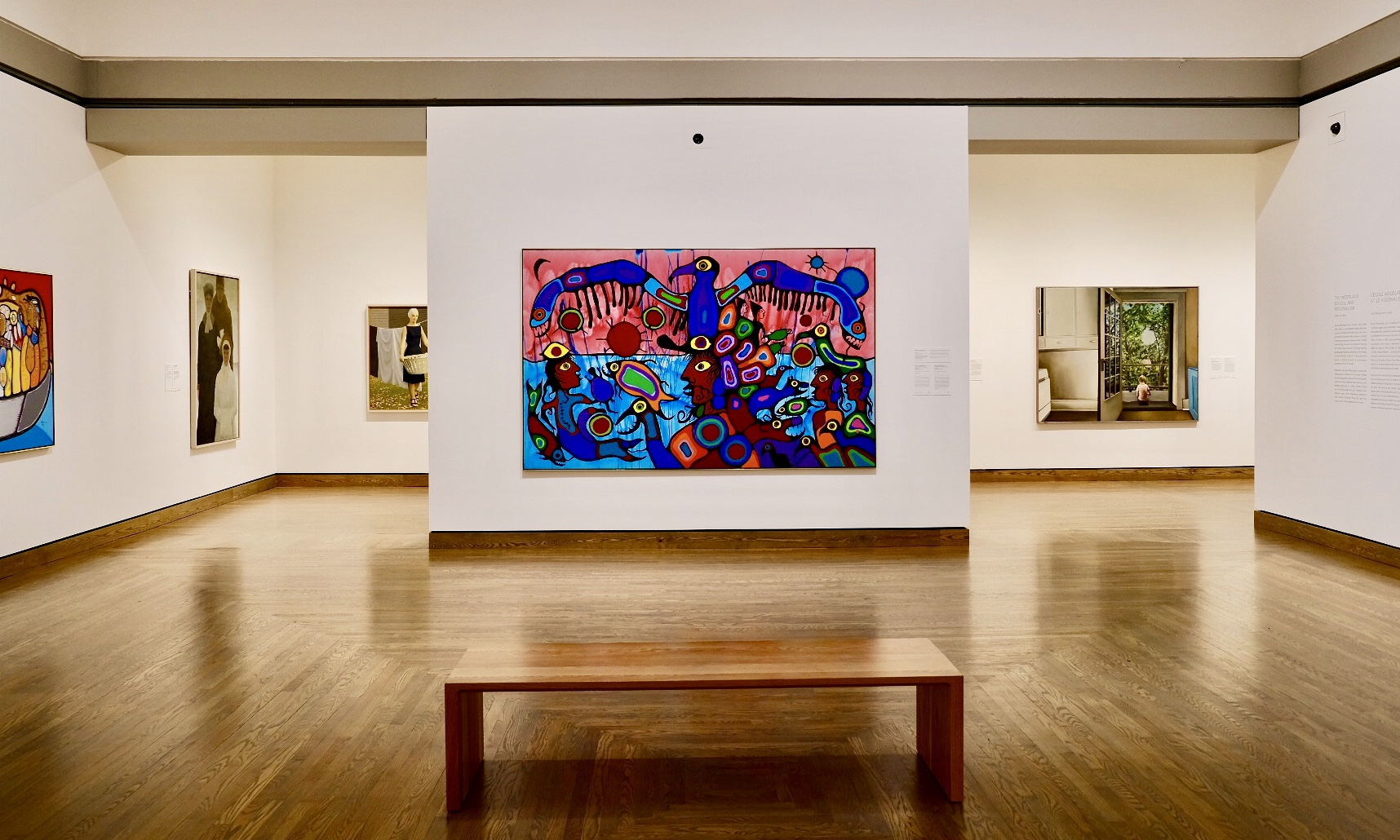
Norval Morrisseau, Artist and Shaman between Two Worlds, 1980, acrylic on canvas, 175 x 282 cm, National Gallery of Canada, Ottawa

Woodlands style, also called the Woodlands school, Legend painting, Medicine painting, and Anishnabe painting, is a genre of painting among First Nations and Native American artists from the Great Lakes area, including northern Ontario and southwestern Manitoba. The majority of the Woodlands artists are Anishinaabeg, notably the Ojibwe, Odawa, and Potawatomi, as well as the Anisininew and the Cree.

== Origin ==
The style was founded by Norval Morrisseau (Bingwi Neyaashi Anishinaabe, 1932–2007), a First Nations Ojibwe artist from Northwestern Ontario, Canada. He learned Ojibwe history and culture primarily from his grandfather Moses "Potan" Nanakonagos and in the 1950s collected oral history of his community. Their history and cosmology provided inspiration and subject matter for his paintings. He also drew upon his personal dreams and visions. Morrisseau said, "All my painting and drawing is really a continuation of the shaman's scrolls." and the Eckankar religion. Ojibwe intaglio, pictographs, petrographs, and birch bark scrolls (wiigwaasabak), were stylistic antecedents of the Woodlands style.

== Style ==
This visionary style emphasizes outlines and X-ray views of people, animals, plants, and spiritual beings. Colours are vivid, even garish. While Morrisseau initially painted on birch bark, he mostly switched to Western art materials, such as acrylic, gouache, or watercolor paints on paper, wood panels, or canvas.

== Woodlands school artists ==
- Ahmoo Angeconeb (Lac Seul First Nation, 1955–2017)
- Jackson Beardy (Anishinini, 1944–1984)
- Benjamin Chee Chee (Eabametoong Ojibwe, 1944–1977)
- Shirley Cheechoo (Cree, b. 1952)
- Kelly Church (Gun Lake Potawatomi/Odawa/Ojibwe, b. 1967)
- Eddy Cobiness (Buffalo Point Ojibwa, 1933–1996)
- Blake Debassige (M'Chigeeng Ojibwe, 1956–2022)
- Tom Hogan, (Ojibwe, 1955–2014)
- Abe Kakepetum (Sandy Lake Oji-Cree)
- Norval Morrisseau (ᒥᐢᒁᐱᐦᐠ ᐊᓂᒥᐦᑮ/ Miskwaabik Animikii) (Bingwi Neyaashi Ojibwe, ca. 1932–2007)
- Daphne Odjig (Odawa/Potawatomi, 1919–2016)
- Carl Ray (Sandy Lake Cree, 1943–1978)
- Roy Thomas (Long Lake Ojibway, 1949–2004)
- Jackie Traverse (Lake St. Martin Ojibway, b. 1968)

== See also ==
- Professional Native Indian Artists Inc.
- Triple K Co-operative
