= Jack Pollock =

Author, painter, art educator and art dealer (1930–1992)

Jack Henry Pollock (1 August 1930 – 10 December 1992) was an author, painter, art educator, and art dealer who was a fixture on the Toronto art scene for over 3 decades. Pollock was the flamboyant founder and owner of The Pollock Gallery in Toronto. He was widely reputed to have a skilled eye for identifying talent in young artists and was instrumental in the careers of many notable artists that he represented including David Hockney, Susan Ross, Ken Danby, Norval Morrisseau, Roy Thomas, Catherine Senitt, Arnold Shives, Charles Pachter, Robert Bateman, Robert Kost, and Willem de Kooning.

== Professional life ==
Pollock graduated from the Ontario College of Art (OCAD) in 1954 and subsequently studied at the prestigious Slade School of Fine Art in London, England. Afterwards, he returned to Canada and was employed as a colour consultant for a paint company. Pollock's employment was terminated after he had a psychological breakdown requiring hospitalization. During his time in hospital, Pollock experienced the benefits of art therapy which led him to open the Pollock Gallery in 1960.

In 1962, while teaching art classes in Northern Ontario funded by the Ontario Government, Pollock met Norval Morrisseau, a local Ojibwa artist. Pollock immediately recognized the artist's genius and arranged for a solo exhibition at his gallery in Toronto. The response was a sold-out show and brilliant reviews declaring Morrisseau a "genius." Morrisseau went on to become arguably Canada's most important indigenous artist.

In 1966, the National Gallery of Canada acquired a print of Pollock's Remembered Image No.82 for its permanent collection. Pollock had become well respected as an artist despite the overshadowing talent of Morrisseau. Pollock's painting styles were abstract and expressionistic. His later works were highly colourful, simple studies of scenes from his everyday life.

"I'm sure that, if I were to die tomorrow, the single most important thing people would remember me for is, damn it, the discovery of Norval Morrisseau. I'd like to think that I've done other equally important things. However, that's the way it is." Jack Pollock (May 20, 1984)

Although Morrisseau made Pollock famous, the artist proved troublesome at times. In 1973, Pollock found himself accused of theft by Indian Affairs of Canada employee Bob Fox who was "managing" Morrisseau on the side while the artist was incarcerated. Morrisseau had instructed Pollock to take several paintings to Toronto to be sold; Fox accused Pollock of stealing the paintings. Pollock was found not guilty of the charge and in an unusual occurrence, he was complimented at length in the resulting judgement issued by the Court.

"He's eccentric, mad, brilliant. He's an extraordinary human being. I love him and I can't stand him. He's caused me more problems that any other single human being on the face of the earth. Every once in a while he hates me, he'd screw me around. But he loves me. There's a bond between us. Amazing." Jack Pollock (May 1, 1984)

Despite his success and Canadian art world celebrity, Pollock admitted he was not business-minded. Pollock began having serious health and financial difficulties in the late 1970s. In 1976, after having speculated on real estate located around the Art Gallery of Ontario (AGO) and taken on mortgages, he saw the AGO close for construction and his real estate opportunity evaporate. Under enormous financial pressure, he was admitted under psychiatric care to the Clarke Institute of Psychiatry. He recovered after 3 months and re-opened the Pollock Gallery on Scollard Street where, rather than declare bankruptcy as suggested by friends, he began to repay his debts.

In 1979, with Canadian Broadcasting Corporation personality Lister Sinclair, Pollock wrote one of Canada's more notable art books: The Art of Norval Morrisseau. Pollock figures prominently in Derek May's 1981 documentary film on the Toronto art scene, Off the Wall.

== Drug addiction and recovery ==
Some time around this period, Pollock developed an addiction to cocaine, which exacerbated his financial difficulties. Worse still, his relationship with Norval Morrisseau appeared to be undermined by Morrisseau's involvement with alleged mafioso Albert Volpe. Adversely affected by changing economics in the art world and Pollock's lack of business management skills, the Pollock Gallery closed for business in December, 1981. In 1982, Pollock underwent heart surgery at Sunnybrooke Hospital (Toronto, Ontario).

In April 1984, Pollock was exhausted, depressed and attempting to break free of his addiction to cocaine. He had considered suicide and had himself committed under psychiatric care. Afterwards, Pollock fled to a residence he partially owned with friends located in Gordes, southeastern France. During this time period, he began recuperating and trying to come to terms with his life, his relationships and his failures. He concentrated his efforts on personal recovery and rediscovered art therapy. Pollock's choice to refocus on his art led to successful exhibitions. He held exhibitions in Gordes (September, 1984), Marseille (April, 1985) and Vichy (June, 1985). Pollock's warm reception by the French people inspired him immensely and he created 200 paintings, painting almost daily. Also during this time, Pollock was corresponding with a Toronto-based psychiatrist. These letters would later become the basis for an autobiographical book.

In 1988, Pollock returned to Toronto permanently after experiencing significant heart-related health problems. Upon his return, he learned he had contracted HIV. Ever defiant, he held his first major exhibition in five years at the Brownstone Hotel.

== Dear M ==
In 1989, his edited letters to his psychiatrist ("Dear M") were published as a book titled Dear M: Letters from a Gentleman of Excess. :"What that poor bastard was letting himself in for when he said 'Write me'!" "It all just poured out. I don't think I could have made it without those letters." The book was launched at the Bermuda Onion (a leading Toronto jazz restaurant which closed in 1992) and was well received by critics and the public alike. It was shortlisted for the City of Toronto's Toronto Book Awards in 1990. Although the identity of "Dear M" was not acknowledged in the media, his identity was well known within Toronto's gay community. "Dr M" was, in fact, Dr. Murray Wilson (1924–2010), an openly gay senior staff psychiatrist at Toronto's Wellesley Hospital from 1969 to 1985 and a former teacher of psychiatry at University of Ottawa and University of Toronto. Dr. Wilson was also a serious artist.

== Death ==
Jack Pollock was openly gay, writing about his homosexuality in both The Art of Norval Morrisseau and Dear M: Letters from a Gentleman of Excess. He eventually was diagnosed with AIDS and became a vocal advocate for AIDS research and for those suffering from the disease. He spoke openly about his diagnosis and its impact on his life:

"Because my immune system is gone, I was given very potent antibiotics that saved my life but destroyed my middle ear. Now I have no sense of balance, need to walk with a cane and can't go out alone. I miss my old mobility. It's extremely frustrating to wither away." "It didn't seem fair that after I'd gotten my life together, I was hit by AIDS, so I decided to paint my rage. You can lash out on paper, violate it, and it just absorbs the anger. No one gets hurt."

A day before his death, Pollock was scheduled to speak at a benefit for an AIDS hospice at what was billed to be his last public appearance, but Pollock was too ill to leave the hospital and died the next evening, on December 10, 1992. "I've been thinking of death a lot, and I am amazed by its inevitability, frightened, as we all are, of the totally unknown, and yet feel a long sleep is somehow earned by those of us who live on the edge." The last known photograph of Jack Pollock was taken shortly before his death in 1992 at the Kinsman Robinson Galleries (Norval Morrisseau's principal dealer since 1989) beside a Morrisseau painting. As Pollock himself had predicted in 1984, he is still mostly recognized for his association with Norval Morrisseau.

== Pollock Gallery locations ==
One - 205 Elizabeth Street, 1960-1961
Two - 201 Elizabeth Street, 1961-1963
Three - 599 Markham Street, 1963-1971
Four - Phase II, Portland Street 1966-1968
Five - 356 Dundas Street West, 1972-1975
Six - Toronto Dominion Centre, 1972-1973
Seven - 122 Scollard Street, 1975-1982
Eight - 209 Adelaide Street East, 1980-1983
