= Ahmoo Angeconeb =

Canadian Ojibwe artist

- Photo of Angeconeb, date unknown
- Born: April 19, 1955; Sioux Lookout, Ontario
- Died: June 9, 2017 (aged 62); Kenora District, Ontario
- Education: Humber College; York University; Dalhousie University; Lakehead University (BFA, 1993)
- Style: Woodlands style
- Children: 2

Ahmoo Angeconeb (Note: Also known as Allan or Allen Angeconeb.) (19 April 1955 – 9 June 2017) was a Canadian Ojibwe artist. His style was influenced by the Woodlands School, but incorporated elements from different cultures and artistic traditions. He travelled widely and found success as an artist in Europe as well as Canada.

== Early life and education ==
Angeconeb was born to George and Patricia Angeconeb on 19 April 1955 in Sioux Lookout, Ontario. He was raised in Whitefish Bay, part of the Lac Seul First Nation. As a young child he showed an affinity for art, and would make drawings on the walls of the family home. His early education took place in the residential school system. Angeconeb later attended Beaver Brae Secondary School in Kenora, Ontario.

Angeconeb studied visual arts at York University from 1976 to 1977, and attended Dalhousie University from 1985 to 1989, also spending some time at Humber College. Additionally, during the 1970s and 80s he travelled through Europe, Asia and Morocco to study other artistic traditions. Angeconeb graduated from Lakehead University with a Bachelor of Fine Arts in 1993. He served as a teacher of native studies at Dalhousie University.

== Artistic career ==
Angeconeb worked in multiple mediums, including painting, printmaking, drawing and carving. His art was strongly influenced by the Woodlands School, particularly the works of Norval Morrisseau, but incorporated elements from different cultures and artistic traditions. Western artists that influenced him included Picasso, Andy Warhol, Johannes Itten and Kenneth Noland. Carol Podedworny described Angeconeb's works as "beyond homages to his ancestral Ojibwe heritage, visual statements which imply the significance, beauty, and complexity of the arts and cultures of so-called 'primitive' world cultures".

Angeconeb's art became popular in Europe as well as in Canada. He worked to promote other First Nations artists and organized international exhibitions of indigenous art. His works are held in the collections of the Canadian Museum of Civilization, the Royal Ontario Museum, the Art Gallery of Nova Scotia, the Thunder Bay Art Gallery, the MacKenzie Art Gallery, and the McMichael Canadian Art Collection. His sculpture Man from the Caribou Totem is installed at the Thunder Bay Art Gallery's entrance. Collections outside Canada include the Institute of American Indian Arts in Santa Fe, New Mexico, and Osnabrück University in Germany.

== Personal life ==
Angeconeb raised two adopted children with his wife Barb; the couple later divorced. In 2010 Angeconeb suffered a stroke, which left him unable to carve, but he continued to draw. He died of a heart attack on 9 June 2017.
