= Triple K Co-operative =

Canadian silk-screen company

Triple K Co-operative Incorporated is a Canadian Native-run silk-screen company in Red Lake, Ontario that produced high quality limited editions of several artist within the Woodland School of Art from 1973 till the early 1980s. Now it is an online and bricks-and-mortar gallery in Thunder Bay, Ontario.

Triple K was based upon artistic control, self-representation, and self-determination, representing one another and themselves on their own terms, instead of by non-Aboriginal organizations that might have tried to take advantage. It was related to the ideas of the Professional Native Indian Artists Incorporated, better known as the “Indian Group of Seven” which established around the same time.

The name “Triple K” relates to the last name of the three founders and brothers Joshim Kakegamic, Henry Kakegamic and Goyce Kakegamic. Besides their own art work, they made editions for others artist as well like Barry Peters, Paddy Peters, Saul Williams, and their brother-in-law Norval Morrisseau.

== History ==
The basis for the founding of Triple K started in the 1962, when Norval Morrisseau hit the Toronto art scene at the Pollock Gallery. He was the first Aboriginal artist to have work shown in a contemporary art gallery, where his bright, stylized Ojibwa spiritual images were very well received and the contemporary Woodlands Style was born.

Norval Morrisseau was married Harriet Kakegamic who had three brothers, Henry, Joshim and Goyce Kakegamic. As artists, Goyce and Joshim were highly influenced by their brother-in-law Norval Morrisseau, and other artists such as Daphne Odjig. They began painting in their teens, and by the early 1970s, when they were in their twenties, became recognized as professional artists in their own right.

At that time, Native artists were almost completely excluded from the mainstream art community seventies, with exception of Norval Morrisseau. The then called “Indian art exhibitions”, took place primarily in museums or anthropology. To change this position, Native artist took control over their own business affairs in the art worlds, in controlling what had become a tawdry, government-run souvenir business in Indian art and craft, and in managing the image of Native people in Canada. Artist Daphne Odjig was a driven force in these activities. She undertook several actions in the beginning of the 1970s including the creation of Indian Prints of Canada Ltd (1970) a Native-controlled print co-operative, the opening of probably the first Aboriginal artist-run ‘Warehouse Gallery’ (1974) and she initiated the Professional Native Indian Artists Incorporated (1973), better known as the Indian Group of Seven. The last were collectively concerned with copyright issues, art markets, and the politics of the art world at that time.

In the fall of 1973, within the spirit of the age and after learning printmaking techniques at Open Studio in Toronto, Joshim and Goyce and their brother Henry opened the Triple K Co-operative Incorporated, with government support, in a modest building on Howey Street in Red Lake, Ontario.

In the first year of operation they reproduced a number of unlimited editions on cloth and paper. The artist who contributed most of the work were Joshim and Goyce Kakegamic. With the growing reputations of the artists already involved and with the printing of some works by Norval Morrisseau, it became essential to maintain a certain standard. Therefore Triple K decided only to begin printing original limited editions prints. “Original” in the sense that all prints at Triple K were made from drawings designed specifically for the silk-screen process by the artist. The artist was also involved in every step in the process.

At the start of the co-operative Triple K exhibited their productions wherever possible and by the end of that decade they had sold work to forty leading galleries. From 15 May till 30 June 1977 the Royal Ontario Museum exhibited “Contemporary Native Art of Canada – Silk screens from the Triple K Co-operative, Red Lake, Ontario”.

By its success of producing high quality art prints which were both affordable and available, the art of the artist involved was made available throughout Canada and the international art world. Besides artwork of the Kakegamic brothers, they produced work of other artists as well, like Barry Peters, Paddy Peters, Saul Williams, and Norval Morrisseau.

Triple K paved a path for Native artistic control and disbanded in the early 1980s.

== Political and social ideals ==
Triple K was based upon artistic control, self-representation, and self-determination – representing one another and themselves on their own terms, instead of by non-Aboriginal organizations that might have tried to take advantage. They were part of a movement that provided opportunities for artists, such as inclusion in galleries, access to fine arts education, and the creation of Aboriginal artist-run organizations. This movement also included the Professional Native Indian Artists Incorporated, which established around the same time.
