= Thunder Bay Art Gallery =

Coordinates: 48.40533°N 89.26349°W

- Established: 1976
- Location: 1080 Keewatin Street; Thunder Bay, Ontario; P7B 6T7
- Type: Art gallery
- Public transit access: Thunder Bay Transit via Confederation College; 2 5 8 10 16
- Website: theag.ca

The Thunder Bay Art Gallery is Northern Ontario's largest art gallery specializing in the work of contemporary Indigenous artists. It is located on the campus of Confederation College in Thunder Bay, Ontario, Canada. The Thunder Bay Art Gallery is the largest public gallery between Sault Ste. Marie and Winnipeg, featuring over 4,000 sq/ft of exhibition space.

The Thunder Bay Art Gallery opened on Feb 6, 1976, when funds were secured to construct a National Exhibition Centre on the campus of Confederation College. The Gallery was one of 26 newly established national exhibition centres opened in Canadian communities.

Today, the Thunder Bay Art Gallery has over 1800 works of art in its Permanent Collection. The Permanent Collection includes work by Norval Morrisseau, Carl Beam, Daphne Odjig, Robert Houle, Joane Cardinal-Schubert, Shelley Niro, Bob Boyer, Susan Ross, and Benjamin Chee Chee.

A new 37,500 ft² Thunder Bay Art Gallery, designed by architects Patkau and Brook McIlroy with landscape architecture by Janet Rosenberg & Studio, is currently under construction on the city's waterfront, set to open in 2027.
