= Thomas Hogan (artist) =

Canadian First Nations artist

Thomas Hogan (October 31, 1955 – January 17, 2014) was a Canadian First Nations artist. He painted in the Woodlands style, and lived on the streets in several Canadian cities.

== Personal life ==
Hogan was born in Sioux Lookout in northern Ontario. After being abandoned at the age of one year by his Ojibway mother and Irish father, Hogan was raised in foster homes. He was abused as a child by foster parents, and began sniffing glue and drinking alcohol at age thirteen. At seventeen, Hogan was convicted of attempted robbery of a jewelry store, and served two and half years in the Stony Mountain prison in Manitoba. After his release from prison, Hogan was mostly homeless on the streets of Winnipeg and Ottawa. He suffered for alcoholism throughout his life. Hogan died in Ottawa, Ontario in 2014, from heart and liver failure.

== Art ==
Hogan's paintings are considered part of the Woodlands style of First Nations art, founded by Norval Morrisseau. His paintings use bright colours, and portray animals and First Nations mythical figures in outline form. Hogan donated 200 of his paintings to the Ottawa School of Art at his death, with the proceeds of sold paintings going to scholarships for struggling artists.
