= Indians of Canada Pavilion =

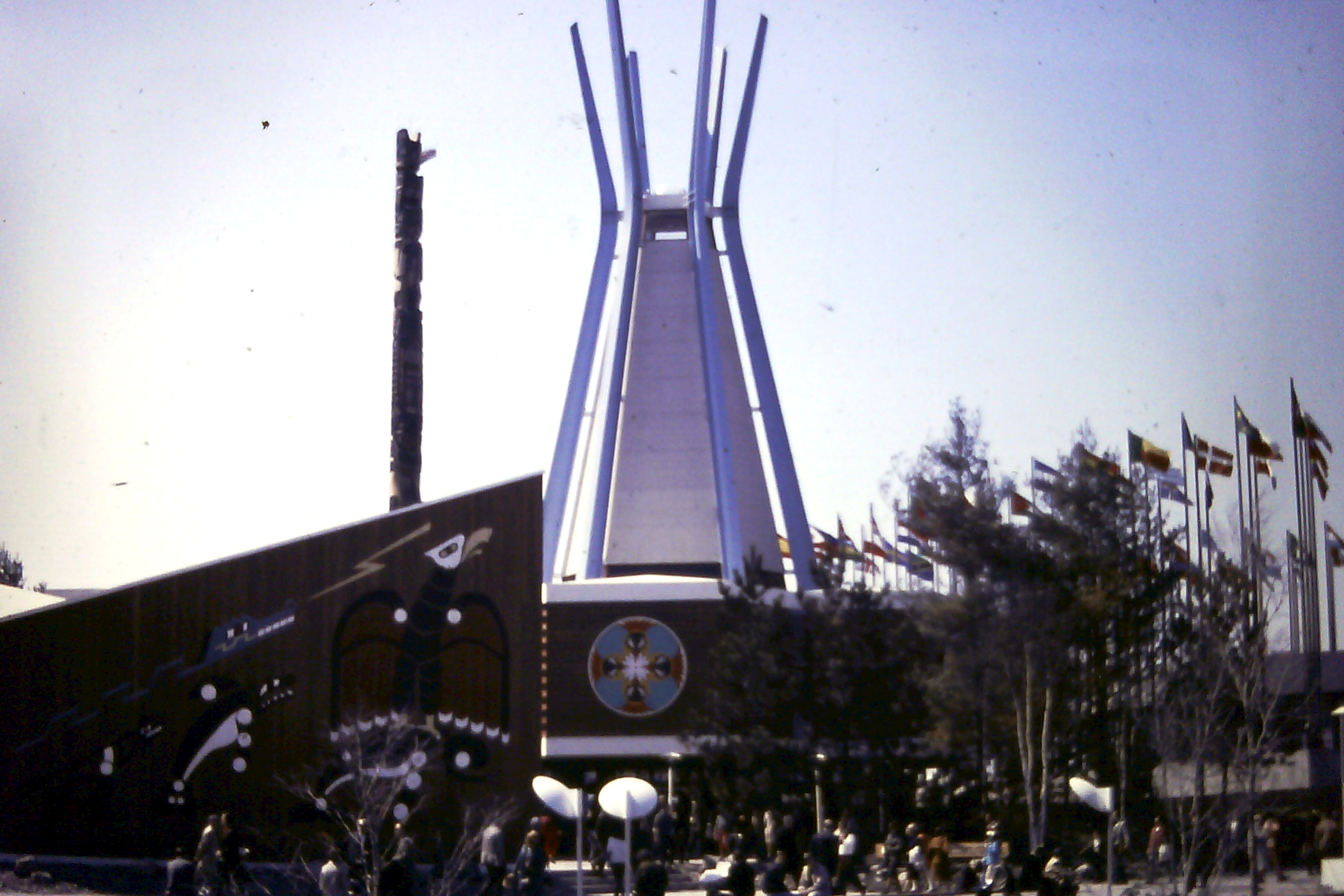
Indians of Canada pavilion.

The Indians of Canada Pavilion was a pavilion at the 1967 International and Universal Exposition in Montreal, Quebec, Canada.

The Pavilion, constructed as a temporary structure for public exhibition at Expo 67, contained works of Indigenous art and culture alongside historical and political commentary concerning the past and present issues facing the Indigenous Peoples in Canada. Organizers consulted with Indigenous leaders and advisors to create the narrative and content exhibited within the pavilion, content which proved to be unexpectedly provocative and controversial by both the Government of Canada and the general public. The exhibits emphasized an Indigenous view of history, which stressed the role the non-Indigenous Canadians and the Canadian Government played in the suppression of Indigenous culture and values, the assimilation of Indigenous children in government funded residential schools, and the history of colonialism and the impact of the doctrine of discovery on the lives Indigenous people from contact to the present day.

== Exhibits and central theme ==
The Contents of the Exhibits were intended to reflect the Indigenous people's answer to the question: "What do you want to tell the people of Canada and the World when they come to Expo in 1967?". Their answer can be found in the central theme of the pavilion, which was "the struggle of the Indian to accept a modern technological society with its mass culture while preserving his identity, his personal integrity, and the moral and spiritual values of his fathers".

One of the methods by which this theme was expressed was through an ever present display of narrative text that led visitors through a variety of themed sections. Examples include "When the White Man Came We Welcomed Him With Love" and "The great explorers of Canada traveled in Indian canoes, wore Indian snow-shoes, ate Indian food, lived in Indian houses. They could not have lived or moved without Indian friends". Both messages were present in the Pavilion's reception area.

Visitors were led past examples of Indigenous art and artifacts such a very large exterior Totem Pole, birch bark canoes, rawhide snowshoes, sculpture, murals and drawings by Indigenous artists such as Alex Janvier, Noel Wuttunee and Norval Morrisseau, and traditional clothing and beadwork, as well as images of pertinent documents such as the Royal Proclamation of 1763, and several crown Treaties.

A section near the end of the pathway through the pavilion contained photographs of indigenous people in modern occupations such as tradesman, craftsmen and farmers, markedly more upbeat than previous exhibits. This section was designed by a branch of Indian Affairs.

The final section contained a large space with a central imitation fire pit that invited visitors to sit and reflect upon the future of Indigenous people of Canada.

The experience of visitors was managed by thirteen Indigenous women, hired from a selection of 220 applicants by Expo organizers, to act as hostesses to guide and interpret the exhibits for those unfamiliar with Indigenous culture. The Indigenous women represented the Siksika, Haisla, Haida, Mi'kmaq, Ojibwa, Mohawk, Innu, and Nlaka'pamux First Nations, among others.

One of principal organizers of the Indian Pavilion was Noel Wuttunee, a Cree artist from Red Pheasant Cree Nation who worked with lawyer and national president William Wuttunee of the National Indian Council to ensure that a different story of Canada was told.

== Response and media reaction ==
Reactions to the exhibits present in the Pavilion from the government, the public and the press ranged from outrage and shock to acceptance and accolade.

Many mainstream journalists critical of the pavilion reacted to the threat the message of the pavilion posed to Canadian Nationalism by criticizing the government for allowing itself to be humiliated. An article in the Toronto Star described the exhibits as an "embarrassment to the Government of Canada.". The Globe and Mail and other newspapers complained that "Ottawa footed the bill" to embarrass itself. An article in the Montreal Star suggest that "the pavilion may raise some hackles in government circles". Other journalists took a different tack, claiming that the Pavilion was a "dig at the white man".

Positive reaction by the mainstream press was more commonplace. Some outlets considered the pavilion thought provoking, While others congratulated the Indigenous people for letting "the Indians to tell their own story in their own way," while reflecting that the "bitterness with the past is justified". A report from the Guelph Mercury summarizes the positive response by the mainstream media well:

"…it is encouraging that the Indians themselves have used this opportunity in this way to dramatize their condition. It is an indication of a new spirit of determination and independence that has for too long been missing. The Indian pavilion at Expo ought to challenge the conscience of every white Canadian who sees it."

Reaction by Indigenous peoples was nuanced. One Indigenous leader thought the pavilion was a "True reflection of the Indian's spirit of dignity". While the then director of the National Congress of American Indians was impressed with the fact that "Canadian Indians may be 50 to 75 years behind [American Indians] in our relations with the federal government".

== See also ==
- Truth and Reconciliation Commission (Canada)
