= Roy Thomas (artist) =

Anishinaabe painter

- Born: 1949; Caramat, Ontario, Canada
- Died: November 13, 2004; Thunder Bay, Ontario, Canada
- Known for: Painter
- Movement: Woodlands style

Roy Thomas (1949–2004) was one of the most influential 20th-century Anishinaabe painters in Canada, and was famous for paintings of colourful totemic animals. Like Norval Morrisseau, he became well known when Indigenous art gained mainstream popularity in the late 1960s and early 1970s.

Thomas and his family moved to the Long Lake 58 Reserve in northern Ontario in the late 1950s. Like many other First Nations youth of his generation, he was forced to attend a religious residential school.

== Death ==
Thomas died of cancer in 2004.
