= Robert Kost =

Canadian prairie artist, known for his magical realism style

Robert T. Kost
- Born: July 6, 1936; Brightstone, Manitoba
- Died: May 13, 2003 (aged 66)
- Education: Self-taught
- Known for: painter
- Style: Impressionist, Magical Realist
- Spouse: Grace Nejedly

Robert Theodore Kost (1936–2003) was a self-taught Canadian prairie artist known for his magic realist style. His art focused on small-town life and the simple beauty of the prairies. His work is featured in the collection of The Canada Council for the Arts and can be seen in collections of large corporations, federal and provincial governments, and private collectors across North America. Kost was notorious for burning any paintings that he was not satisfied with and thus destroyed hundreds of works over the years, yet sold more than 300 paintings over the course of his 40-year career.

== Early life and career ==
Kost was an only child born in Brightstone, Manitoba and raised in nearby Lac du Bonnet. After graduation, Kost studied mechanical drafting in Winnipeg. He took up painting in 1958, after his fiancée, Grace Nejedly, gave him a paint set for Christmas. The couple returned to Lac du Bonnet two years later in order to help his father run an Esso service station. Kost soon turned the Esso sales office into a studio, and his works later covered the walls of the adjoining restaurant, where many early works sold for $15 to $25. Following the death of his father in 1966, Kost sold the service station to focus on his art full-time.

Kost’s first public exhibition took place in March 1966 at the Hudson’s Bay store in downtown Winnipeg. A second exhibition was held at a Hudson's Bay in Saskatoon the following year. The Canadian Mental Health Association displayed his work at Winnipeg’s Centennial Concert Hall in 1969, which resulted in a favourable review in the Winnipeg Free Press that helped launch his career.

== Rise to notoriety ==
Kost’s big break came in 1975 when he partnered with Toronto art dealer Jack Pollock. A subsequent exhibition in Toronto received a glowing review in The Globe and Mail, which got other art critics talking, including Arnold Edinborough of the Financial Post, who declared Kost "one of the great finds." Kost's art was showcased in major exhibitions nationwide throughout the mid-1970s and 1980s. In addition to major exhibitions, Gallery 757 and Fleet Gallery also showcased his work.

Imperial Oil commissioned Kost to create a series of Blackbird paintings; he was featured in an MTS TV commercial; and At the Picnic Table was used as the cover art of a mid-1990s MTS regional phone book. Kost’s final painting—of his grandson, Lucas, on the shores of Grand Beach was completed just before his death in 2003.

Kost's art is in the collection of the Canada Council Art Bank and represented by Mayberry Fine Art, among others.

== Style and influence ==
Kost's early style embraced a loose impressionism, but after discovering the work of realist painters such as Andrew Wyeth in the mid-late 1960s, he rediscovered the landscape of his childhood and eventually changed his approach. Kost’s style went through a dramatic transformation, shifting from impressionistic to the highly realistic style he is so well known for today. However, unlike other realist painters, Kost used acrylics instead of oils. His first realist painting, November Snow, was completed in 1970.

As a symbol of re-commitment to realism, Kost destroyed many of his early abstract works, and went on to burn hundreds of paintings that he was not satisfied with over the course of his career.

His early influences included the Group of Seven, Tom Thomson, and French impressionists such as Vincent van Gogh. Later, he was inspired by the Fauves, German expressionists, and David Milne. He also found inspiration in the works of American realist painters such as Andrew Wyeth.

Kost is often compared to renowned Canadian painter Alex Colville, yet made a name for himself through dreamlike portrayals of ineffable loneliness on the Canadian prairies. In 2002, The Winnipeg Free Press art critic Bill Redekop proclaimed:

Nobody has ever painted Lake Winnipeg and its grey-green-blue-late waters better. Nobody.

== Personal life ==
Kost married wife Grace Nejedly in 1959. The couple had three children: Anthony, Karen, and Jonathan. Kost enjoyed bluegrass music and played the fiddle. In the early 1990s, his band, the Ain't No Mountain Boys, played a side stage at the Winnipeg Folk Festival. Kost was also an avid golfer, and played an early role in the development of the Granite Hills Golf Course. He suffered a silent heart attack in 1992 and had a quadruple bypass the following year.
