= Susan Ross (artist) =

Canadian artist (1915–2006)

Susan Andrina Ross CM (3 June 1915 – 5 January 2006), was a Canadian painter, printmaker, and illustrator from Port Arthur, Ontario who is best known for her portraits of Native and Inuit peoples as well as Arctic landscapes. Her work is valuable both for its artistry and for its historical significance since she captured many images of a passing way of life. In 2002, she was awarded the Order of Canada in the Visual Arts.

== Early life ==
Susan Ross was one of four girls born to Colonel and Mrs. Harry Ruttan in Port Arthur, Ontario. Ross showed an interest in drawing at a very young age and was encouraged by her mother to take art lessons. Her art education continued through high school where Ross began studying anatomy. An important and early influence in her life was her uncle, the documentary filmmaker Robert Flaherty, who is best known for his film Nanook of the North. Flaherty offered Ross an example of a person who was well traveled and had lived with, and documented the lifestyle of, the Inuit. Flaherty also provided Ross with the means to attend the Ontario College of Art in Toronto in 1933. In 1938, in the last term of her fourth year, Ross left before graduating to marry Jim Ross, a Port Arthur lawyer, and later a judge, with whom she eventually had four children.

== Work ==
Sam Kakegamic, Sandy Lake painting by Susan Ross, 1966

Ross returned to Port Arthur to begin a family and also to continue with her art work. Painting in the 1940s and 1950s at Lake Superior, Rossport, and Whitefish lake, Ross strove to be taken seriously as an artist. She signed her work "S.A. Ross" or "SARoss" because "women did not have any clout". Ross was active in the Port Arthur Art Club which held exhibitions and juried shows at the local library, there being no public art gallery there at the time. From 1951 to 1952, Ross taught art at Hillcrest High School. Ross experimented with new techniques, textural effects, such as scraping-out or using tissue and glue, and mixing layers of watercolor paint between printed layers in etchings. As such her work contributed to the shift to modernism that was taking place in Canada. Although Ross never abandoned figurative representations, her rationalized and planar compositions hint at the influence of cubism.

Ross continued her love of portraiture, painting friends and neighbors' children but eventually began to focus her efforts and inspiration on First Nations people after meeting an Ojibwa woman named Emily and seeing First Nations wild-rice harvesters at Whitefish Lake. Soon after the Second World War, Ross had met Sheila Burnford the author of The Incredible Journey, an animal saga that Walt Disney adapted for the cinema. Ross and Burnford would subsequently travel extensively together. Norval Morrisseau invited Ross to Gull Bay and Armstrong to paint while he collected legends and songs and then subsequently to Big Trout Lake and finally to Sandy Lake. It was in Sandy Lake that Ross met Carl Ray and painted his portrait among many others. Ross and Morrisseau remained friends for many years although their friendship eventually became strained by Morrisseau's legendary drinking binges - a Morrisseau sketch entitled "Susan" depicting their friendship is held in the collection of the National Gallery of Canada.

Fisherman, Rae-Edzo, NWT etching by Susan Ross circa 1982-83

Ross returned to Big Trout Lake in 1963–1965 and 1975, to Sandy lake in 1965–1967 and to Little Grand Rapids Manitoba in 1967–1970. Ross then turned her sights to venues even farther north, traveling with Sheila Burnford to Pond Inlet, Baffin Island in 1970–1971, to Coppermine, Northwest Territories in 1972, 1974, 1976–1978, 1983, to Hollman Island, Northwest Territories in 1972, 1976 and to Cape Dorset, Baffin Island in 1973, to Pangnirtung, Baffin Island in 1980, and to Rae-Edzo, Northwest Territories and Kasechewan, Ontario in 1982–1983. On these trips Ross made many friends. Ross also encountered many challenges as would be expected in such northern and unforgiving vistas. For example, once returning to Cape Dorset from a remote island with a small group, the motor on the small boat they were traveling in failed - she and her group drifted four hours, a sail was deployed to no avail and finally gunshots were fired to elicit help from a nearby settlement - the group was finally towed to safety.

Ross took an etching workshop with Jo Manning in 1967 and acquired a printing press in 1969. She then began producing high quality etchings and, drawing on the rich array of sketches obtained on her various trips, she was able to reflect and structure many of these images more rigorously in the studio. Being the "right person at the right place in a very dramatic time in Canadian history", she was able to capture and document a period of rapid change in many northern communities. In many of these images "the human toll is recorded in the faces of individuals and in the cumulative details of daily existence".

Ross illustrated Sheila Burnford's books "Without Reserve" and "One Woman's Arctic" which document Burnford and Ross' travels, as well as Penny Petrone's book "Fairy Tales of Isabella Valancy Crawford" and Jocelyn Square's "SHA-KO-KA". Her works were also featured on several covers of the Canadian magazine "The Beaver". Ross was instrumental in the mounting of the first art shows for both Carl Ray and Daphne Odjig and had "served as a mentor, a source of encouragement, and a source of financial assistance to numerous artists".

== Solo exhibitions ==
1964 Pollock Gallery, Toronto, Ontario
1965 Fleet Gallery, Winnipeg, Manitoba
1966 Pollock Gallery, Toronto, Ontario
1966–1967 Fleet Gallery, Winnipeg, Manitoba
1969 Pollock Gallery, Toronto, Ontario
1969 Fleet Gallery, Winnipeg, Manitoba
1971 Royal Ontario Museum, Toronto, Ontario
1973 Fort Francis Public Library, Fort Frances, Ontario
1973 Confederation College, Thunder Bay, Ontario
1977 Johnson Gallery, Edmonton, Alberta
1979–1983 Cardigan-Milne Gallery, Winnipeg, Manitoba
1984 Thunder Bay National Exhibition Center and Center for Indian Art, Thunder Bay, Ontario
1984 Brampton Public Library and Art Gallery, Brampton, Ontario
1988 Gallery Phillip, Toronto, Ontario
1994 Thunder Bay Art Gallery, Thunder Bay, Ontario

== Group exhibitions ==
1945–1960 Lakehead Society of Fine Arts juried shows, Port Arthur, Ontario
1952 Two-person Exhibition, Port Arthur Public Library, Port Arthur, Ontario
1960–1974 Lakehead Visual Arts juried shows, Port Arthur/Thunder Bay, Ontario
1962 Chapel Gallery, Toronto, Ontario
1965 Northwestern Ontario Art Association, Port Arthur, Ontario, traveling exhibition
1965 Faces of Canada, Stratford Exhibition Hall, Stratford, Ontario
1967 Paintings of a Province, Art Institute of Ontario for the Centennial of Canadian Confederation, traveling exhibition
1980, 1982, 1984 Gallery of Fine Arts, Thunder Bay, Ontario
1981 Nistawayan Friendship Centre, Fort McMurray, Alberta
1987–1991 Gallery Phillip, Toronto, Ontario

== Collections ==
Art Gallery of Peterborough, Peterborough, Ontario
Confederation College, Thunder Bay, Ontario
Lakehead University, Thunder Bay, Ontario
Ontario Institute for Education Studies, Toronto, Ontario
Province of Ontario Art Collection, Toronto, Ontario
Robert McLaughlin Gallery, Oshawa, Ontario
Thames Art Gallery, Chatham, Ontario Thunder Bay Art Gallery, Thunder Bay, Ontario
Thunder Bay Historical Museum Society, Thunder Bay, Ontario
Tom Thompson Gallery, Owen Sound Ontario
Winnipeg Art Gallery, Winnipeg, Manitoba
