= David Voss =

Canadian art forger of Indigenous artworks

David Voss is a Canadian art forger of Indigenous artworks, in particular those of the artist Norval Morrisseau, of the Ojibway Bingwi Neyaashi Anishinaabek First Nation who has been deceased since 2007. Voss has forged documents as a part of a fraud ring that was based in Thunder Bay, Ontario.

Voss and a ring of eight others were arrested in 2023 for forging and selling works allegedly by Morrisseau for over a decade. Voss and his team worked in an assembly to produce forgeries using a "paint-by-numbers" process to create fake paintings. The forgeries were detected when forensic analysts used infrared photographic processes to discover paint-by-number-like pencil markings on the underdrawings beneath the painted surfaces.

Voss and his team forged thousands of artworks by Morrisseau. The forgeries resulted in $100 million Canadian dollars of losses to the artist's estate.

ARTnews reported that "Voss oversaw the production of thousands of artworks falsely attributed to Anishinaabe artist Norval Morrisseau." 500 of these forgeries have been seized by law enforcement as of June 2024.

Voss, who was 52 years of age at the sentencing, pleaded guilty to the art fraud ring charges. The sentencing judge declared the forgery ring as the "largest art fraud in history" in Canada. Artforum magazine called the operation the "world's biggest art fraud." Voss, who was described as the "principal architect" of the forgery ring, was sentenced to five years in prison for his role in the forgeries. Gary Lamont, who has been described as "the ringleader of the operation" also received a five year sentence, and six others were charged for the crime in 2023. In addition to Voss and Lamont, Benjamin Paul Morrisseau, who is a nephew of the artist Norval Morrisseau, participated in reparation activities with tribal elders. Also charged were James White of Essa Township and David P. Bremner of Locust Hill and Jeffrey Gordon Cowan of Niagara-on-the-Lake.

The 2019 documentary film There Are No Fakes, was inspired by the forgeries of Norvall Morrisseau's art works.

== See also ==
- Art forgery
- Indian Arts and Crafts Act of 1990
