= Robert Houle =

Saulteaux First Nations Canadian artist

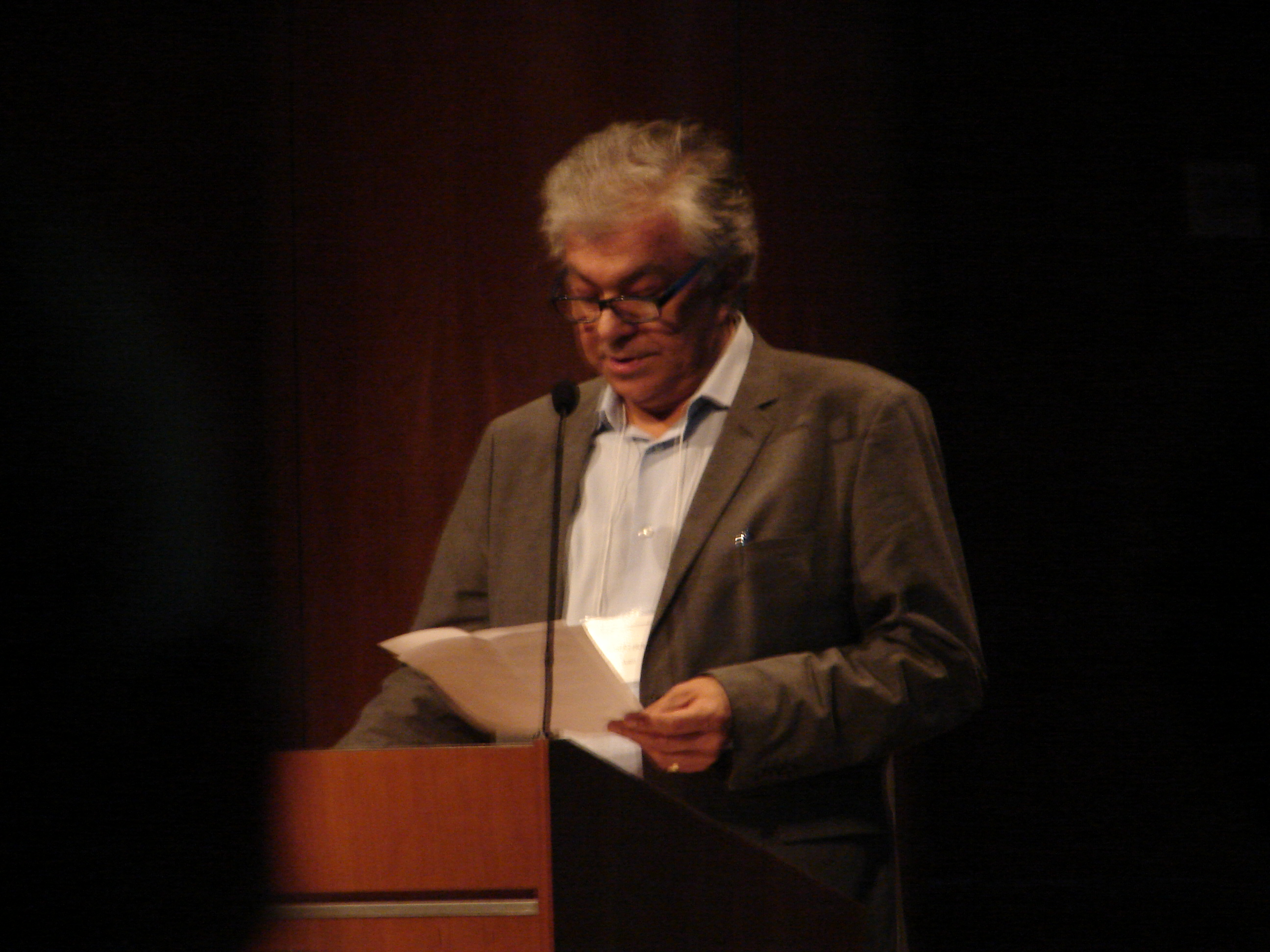
- Born: March 9, 1947 (age 79); Saint Boniface, Manitoba, Canada
- Education: BA, Art History University of Manitoba; BE, Art Education McGill University
- Known for: oil painter, photographer, installation artist, multimedia artist
- Notable work: The Place Where God Lives (1989), Seven in Steel (1989), Kanata (1992)
- Partner: Paul Gardner

Robert Houle RCA (born 1947) is a Saulteaux First Nations Canadian artist, curator, critic, and educator. Houle has had an active curatorial and artistic practice since the mid-1970s. He played an important role in bridging the gap between contemporary First Nations artists and the broader Canadian art scene through his writing and involvement in early important high-profile exhibitions such as Land, Spirit, Power: First Nations at the National Gallery of Canada (Ottawa, 1992). As an artist, Houle has shown both nationally and internationally. He is predominantly a painter working in the tradition of Abstraction, yet he has also embraced a pop sensibility by incorporating everyday images and text into his works. His work addresses lingering aspects of colonialism and their effects on First Nation peoples. Houle often appropriates historical photographs and texts, repurposing and combining them with Anishnaabe language and traditionally used materials such as porcupine quills within his works.

== Biography ==
Houle was born in St. Boniface, Manitoba on 9 March 1947 to parents Gladys and Solomon Houle. He was the eldest of fifteen children, all of whom were raised Roman Catholic and Saulteaux. From grades one through eight he attended the Oblates of Mary Immaculate and Sisters of St. Joseph of St. Hyacinth School Residential Schools in Sandy Bay (Kaa-wii-kwe-tawang-kak).

Houle earned his Bachelor of Arts in Art History from the University of Manitoba in 1972. After graduating, he augmented his art training by attending the Salzburg International Summer Academy focusing on painting and drawing. In 1975, he earned his Bachelor of Education degree in Art Education at McGill University in Montreal, Quebec. While studying at McGill he taught art classes at the Indian Way School in Kahnawake.

In 1991, Houle took a position as the first professor of Indigenous Studies at The Ontario College of Art (now OCAD University), where he taught for fifteen years, mentoring artists including Bonnie Devine and Michael Belmore.

== Artwork ==
Premises for Self-Rule: The Royal Proclamation, 1763 (1994) at the Smithsonian National Museum of the American Indian in 2023

Houle's paintings have been exhibited at the National Gallery of Canada, Ottawa; the Art Gallery of Ontario, Toronto; Museum of Contemporary Art, Sydney; the Canadian Cultural Centre in Paris; and the Stedelijk Museum, Holland.

In Canada, he has shown work at the Mendel Art Gallery, the Museum of Contemporary Canadian Art, the Carleton University Art Gallery, the Agnes Etherington Art Centre, Tom Thomson Memorial Art Gallery, the Art Gallery of Ontario, La Biennale de Montreal, the Art Gallery of Peterborough and the Winnipeg Art Gallery.

His artwork has been collected throughout Canada and in parts of the United States and Australia.

== Career ==
From 1977 to 1981, Houle was the first Indigenous curator of contemporary Indigenous Art at the Canadian Museum of Civilisation (now the Canadian Museum of History) in Ottawa. His work at the CMC consisted of researching and writing about the pre-existing collection, as well as advocating for new acquisitions and developing his own practice. He travelled widely in pursuit of this work, becoming close with Abraham Anghik Ruben, Robert Davidson, Norval Morrisseau, Carl Beam, Daphne Odjig, Alex Janvier, and Robert Boyer in the process. However, what he felt was the inhospitable, often irresponsible culture at museum began to take its toll, and after three years, Houle resigned, later stating:

I realized that artistically and aesthetically I was in hostile territory. There was no place to exhibit the contemporary works I bought for the museum, and I just could not accept that, as a practising artist, what I made had to be relegated to the realm of anthropology.

He has curated and co-curated ground-breaking exhibitions such as New Work By a New Generation, at the Norman Mackenzie Art Gallery in Regina in 1982, and Land Spirit Power: First Nations at the National Gallery of Canada in 1992. He has been a visiting artist at Hood College, Gettysburg College, the Heard Museum, the McMichael Canadian Art Collection and the Winnipeg Art Gallery. For years, he taught as an instructor at the Ontario College of Art and Design, from which he is now retired. He was made a member of the Royal Canadian Academy of Arts. Houle's considerable influence as an artist, curator, teacher and writer have led to his being awarded the Janet Braide Memorial Award for Excellence in Canadian art History in 2003; the 2001 Toronto Arts award for the Visual Arts; the Eiteljorg Fellowship in 2003 and in 2006. In 2015, he was awarded the Governor General's Award in Visual and Media Arts.

== Collections ==
Houle's work is in public collections including the Art Gallery of Ontario, Heard Museum, Laurentian University Museum and Arts Centre, McGill University, and National Gallery of Canada.
