= Blake Debassige =

Native Canadian artist

Blake Debassige was a Native Canadian artist of the M'Chigeeng First Nation, born at West Bay on Manitoulin Island in Ontario on June 22, 1956, died June 13, 2022. A leading member of the "second generation" of Ojibwa artists influenced by Norval Morrisseau, Debassige has broadened the stylistic and thematic range of this group. Debassige's paintings and graphics frequently investigate traditional Anishabek teachings about the nature of cosmic order, the cycles of the seasons, the interdependence of animal, plant and human life and the common principles at work in the world's great spiritual systems. He frequently relates these themes to highly contemporary problems such as the destruction of the environment, the alienation of native youth and family dysfunction.

Debassige married the Cree painter Shirley CheeChoo in 1978.

== Solo exhibitions ==
- Debosegai, curated and toured by the Thunder Bay Art Gallery, July 12-September 8, 1985

== Group exhibitions ==
- The art of the Anishnawbek : three perspectives: exhibition held at the Royal Ontario Museum, 9 March 1996-Spring 1997
- Political landscapes # two:sacred and secular sites : an exhibition of work by thirteen artists from two communities, co-curated by Debassige and Stephen Hogbin and hosted at the Tom Thomson Memorial Art Gallery, August 23-September 22, 1991 and the Ojibway Cultural Foundation and Kasheese Studio, West Bay, Manitoulin Island, Sept. 27-Oct. 20, 1991
- Woodlands: Contemporary Art of the Anishnabe, curated by the Thunder Bay Art Gallery July 7-September 3, 1989
- Manitoulin Island: The Third Layer, curated by the Thunder Bay Art Gallery April 3-May 24, 1987
- Last Camp, First Song: Indian Art from the Royal Ontario Museum, curated by the Thunder Bay Art Gallery, June 15-July 31, 1983
- Anishnabe mee-kun : a circulating exhibition of art by Anishnabe artists of the Manitoulin Island area. Exhibition held at the Ojibwe Cultural Foundation, West Bay, Manitoulin Island, Sept. 15-Oct. 20, 1980

== Collections ==
- McMichael Canadian Art Collection
- Ojibwe Cultural Foundation, Manitoulin Island
