= Lac Seul First Nation =

Lac Seul 28 Obishikokaang
- Indian reserve
- Lac Seul Indian Reserve No. 28
- Location within Ontario
- Coordinates: 50°15′N 92°13′W
- Country: Canada
- Province: Ontario
- District: Kenora
- First Nation: Lac Seul

Area
  - Land: 239.09 km^{2} (92.31 sq mi)

Population (2011)
  - Total: 872
  - Density: 3.6/km^{2} (9.3/sq mi)
- Website: lacseulfn.org

Lac Seul First Nation is an Ojibwe First Nation band government located on the southeastern shores of Lac Seul, 56 kilometres (35 mi) northeast of the city of Dryden, Ontario. Though Lac Seul First Nation is a treaty signatory to Treaty 3, the First Nation is a member of the Independent First Nations Alliance, a regional tribal council and a member of the Nishnawbe Aski Nation.

The registered population of Lac Seul was 2,837 persons in April 2008, of which the on-reserve population was 774. The First Nation have the 26,821.5 hectares (104 sq mi) Lac Seul 28 Indian reserve, known as Obishikokaang in the Anishinaabe language, containing three settlements. Frenchmen's Head is accessible by road and is approximately 40 kilometres (25 mi) from Sioux Lookout. Whitefish Bay is also newly accessible by road and is approximately 50 kilometres (31 mi) from Sioux Lookout, Ontario. Kejick Bay is approximately 60 kilometres (37 mi) northwest of Sioux Lookout and is accessible by road and water and air. Frenchmen's Head and Kejick Bay each have a population of about 400 each, while Whitefish Bay has a population of about 100.

In 1929 Ontario Hydro constructed a dam at Ear Falls to control the level of the lake to produce hydroelectricity. The flooding from turning the lake into a reservoir caused the area known previously as Kejick Bay to become an island, permanently separating it from the mainland and splitting the community into two parts. The island portion retained the name Kejick Bay and the portion of the community on the mainland became Whitefish Bay.

The Indian reserve is bordered on all sides by territory of the Unorganized Kenora District, except at its southeast, which borders the town of Sioux Lookout.

== Name ==
The French name for the lake and the reserve, Lac Seul, may be a mistranslation of Obishikokaang as Obezhigokaang: "Sole Abundance". The meaning of Obishikokaang is not known but the typical translation of Obishikokaang provided is "Narrows [Abundant] with White Pine" or "White Pine Narrows", which in common Ojibwe should be something closer to Obaazhingwaakokaang.

== Governance ==
The Lac Seul First Nation is governed by

Chief

Clifford Bull

Frenchman’s Head Council

Samantha Kejick

Elvis Trout

Donna Ningewance

Clayton Littledeer

Kejick Bay Council

Derek Maud

Stan Littledeer

DeShawn Littledeer

Whitefish Bay Council

Marcel Potan

== Settlements ==
- Canoe River, Ontario—a historical settlement, which its residents were relocated to Kejick Bay
- Frenchmen's Head, Ontario (Wemitigoozhiiwitigwaaning)
- Kejick Bay, Ontario
- Whitefish Bay, Ontario
- Hudson, Kenora District—a nearby town with many residents registered with Lac Seul First Nation

== Notable members ==
- Rebecca Belmore, performance and installation artist
- Ahmoo Angeconeb (1955–2017), artist
- Jesse Terry, 2026 Iditarod Rookie of the Year
- Alicia Anderson, journalist
- Jordyn Angeconeb, drag artist & activist
