= Morgan Wood =

Morgan Wood (b. June 12, 1956) is a curator and artist who is Stony Mountain Cree. Her family is from the Michel Callihou Band in Alberta and her great-grandmother was Victoria Callihou. She was born in Moose Jaw, Saskatchewan. Wood received a Bachelor of Indian Art from the First Nations University of Canada, at the University of Regina in Regina, Saskatchewan.

In 2003, Wood participated in the Aboriginal Curatorial Residency at the Mendel Art Gallery in Saskatoon. During that time, she wrote Wildfire on the Plains: Contemporary Saskatchewan Art.

She was a member of the Saskatchewan Aboriginal Museum Advisory Board for the Saskatchewan Museum Association.

== Work ==
"Here and Now" was an exhibition at the Dunlop Art Gallery, in Regina in 1999 that brought together contemporary Aboriginal art work from the southern half of Saskatchewan. Wood created "Exxxposed: Aesthetics of Aboriginal Erotic Art" with the MacKenzie Art Gallery, Regina in1999.

Her art piece, "Hands Off My Genes" (1997), was on display at the MacKenzie Art Gallery. It is a sculpture made of a pair of found blue jeans in the surrealist and dadaist style. The jeans have been left open to resemble a woman's legs and abdomen, equipped with protruding porcupine quills in white and blue. Wood referred to porcupine quills in another work titled "Love & Sex" (1995).

Her work was included in an exhibit curated by Leah Taylor titled "Towards Action" at the Kenderdine Art Gallery in 2017 alongside the works of Allyson Clay, Marcel Dzama, Angela Grossmann, Istvan Kantor, Alastair Mackie, Jane Ash Poitras and John Scott.

== Writing ==
- Odjig, Daphne; Wood, Morgan; Gallery, Kamloops Art (2005). "Daphne Odjig". Daphne Odjig: four decades of prints. Kamloops Art Gallery. p. 9–22. ISBN 1-895497-61-2..
- Wild fire on the plains : contemporary Saskatchewan art : Anthony Deiter, David Garneau, Cheryl L'hirondelle-Waynohtêw, Neal McLeod.
- Lee-Ann Martin; Morgan Wood (Summer 1998). "Shaping the Future of Aboriginal Curatoral Practice" (PDF). Inuit Art Quarterly. 13 (2): 22–25.
- The Print Years. Kamloops Art Gallery, Kamloops, British Columbia. April, 2005.
- Riel Benn catalogue. Moose Jaw Art Gallery and Museum, Moose Jaw, Saskatchewan, October, 2004
- Projects and Partnerships Folio, Mendel Art Gallery, Saskatoon, Saskatchewan. May 2003.
- Wildfire on the Plains: Contemporary Saskatchewan Artists. Mendel Art Gallery, Saskatoon Saskatchewan, 2003
- With Martin, Lee-Ann. Exposed: the Aesthetics of Aboriginal Erotic Art. Mackenzie Art Gallery, Regina, Saskatchewan. October, 1999.
- with Martin, Lee-Ann. Shaping the Future of Aboriginal Curatorial Practice Inuit Art Quarterly. Volume 13, No. 2 Summer 1998.
- Here & Now. Regina, Saskatchewan: Dunlop Art Gallery. 1997
- Works From The Bob Boyer Children’s Collaborative Project. Regina, Saskatchewan: Dunlop Art Gallery. 1992
- Moses' Play Challenges Popular Cultural Images. Iron Bow Arts Today. Volume 1, No. 3:2
- "Links between Oral Tradition and Print Media Explored at Duck Lake". Iron Bow Arts Today. Volume 1, No. 3: 1-2
- "Metis Traditions Celebrated in Farrell Racette Show". Iron Bow Arts Today. Volume 1, No. 2:7
