= Bonnie Devine =

Canadian Ojibway artist (born 1952)

- Born: Bonnie Devine; April 12, 1952 (age 74); Toronto, Ontario, Canada
- Known for: Installation artist, performance artist, sculptor, writer
- Awards: Eiteljorg Fellowship (2011)

Bonnie Devine (born April 12, 1952) is a Serpent River Ojibwa installation artist, performance artist, sculptor, curator, and writer from Serpent River First Nation, who lives and works in Toronto, Ontario. She is currently an associate professor at OCAD University and the founding chair of its Indigenous Visual Cultural Program.

== Background ==
Bonnie Devine was born in Toronto and is a status member of the Serpent River First Nation. In 1997, Devine graduated from the Ontario College of Art and Design, with degrees in sculpture and installation, and she earned her Master of Fine Arts degree at York University in 1999. She has taught studio and liberal arts at York University, Queen's University, and the Centre for Indigenous Theatre. She joined OCAD University as a full-time instructor in 2008 and was a founding chair of the university's Indigenous Visual Culture program.

== Artwork ==
As a conceptual artist, Devine works with a variety of media, often combining traditional and unconventional materials. At a 2007 solo exhibition, Medicine River, at the Axéneo 7 art space in Quebec, she created eight-foot long knitting needles and knitted 250 feet of copper cable to bring attention to the contamination of the Kashechewan water system. She has fashioned full-sized canoes from paper and works with natural materials such as reeds in her 2009 piece, New Earth Braid. She also created land-based installations.

Devine's work is also primarily influenced by "the stories, technologies, and arts of the Ojibwa people."

== Exhibitions ==
Devine's work has been exhibited in solo and group exhibitions in Canada, the U.S., South America, Russia and Europe. Her 2010 solo exhibition, Writing Home, curated by Faye Heavyshield, was reviewed in Border Crossings. A solo exhibition of Devine's work, Bonnie Devine: The Tecumseh Papers was held at the Art Gallery of Windsor from September 27, 2013, to January 5, 2014. Her work is featured in the Art Gallery of Ontario's exhibition Before and after the Horizon: Anishinaabe Artists of the Great Lakes. In 2026, Devine was included in In Minor Keys, the central exhibition of the 61st International Art Exhibition of the Venice Biennale, curated by Koyo Kouoh. Her presentation included works from Land in War (2024-2025), a series examining Indigenous veterans' experiences and the legacies of colonial conflict.

== Awards and recognition ==
Devine has received numerous awards, including 2002 Best Experimental Video at the imagineNATIVE Film + Media Arts Festival, the Toronto Arts Awards Visual Arts Protégé Award in 2001, the Curry Award from the Ontario Society of Artists in 1999, a variety of awards from the Ontario College of Art and Design, as well as many grants and scholarships. She has been chosen for the 2011 Eiteljorg Museum fellowship. She received a Governor General's Award in Visual and Media Arts in 2021.

== Published work ==
- Devine, Bonnie, Duke Redbird, and Robert Houle. The Drawings and Paintings of Daphne Odjig: A Retrospective Exhibition. Ottawa: National Gallery of Canada, 2007. ISBN 978-0-88884-840-6.
