= Benjamin Chee Chee =

Canadian artist (1944-1977)

- Born: 26 March 1944; Temagami, Ontario, Canada
- Died: 14 March 1977 (aged 32); Ottawa, Ontario, Canada
- Education: Self-taught
- Known for: Painting
- Movement: Woodland School of Art

Kenneth Thomas Benjamin Chee Chee (26 March 1944 – 14 March 1977), known as Benjamin Chee Chee, was an Ojibwa Canadian artist born in Temagami, Ontario. He is best known for his modern, simplified, and graceful depictions of birds and animals, mainly the Canadian goose.

== Early life ==
Chee Chee's father died when he was very young, and as a child, Chee Chee was separated from his mother and sent to residential school. He later spent 12 years searching for her before he found her. He moved to Montreal in 1965 where he developed his love of drawing, and moved back to Ottawa in 1973.

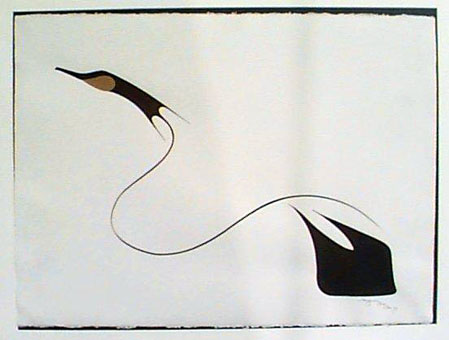
Goose in Flight, an original Chee Chee painting as seen in The Canadian Encyclopedia

== Career ==
Chee Chee's first exhibition was held in 1973 at the University of Ottawa, and featured abstract compositions of block-stamped geometric motifs. By 1976 he had gained recognition as he developed his style of clear graceful lines and minimal colour, depicting birds and animals. Though his art featured iconography often used by Canadian First Nations artists, Chee Chee denied his art had symbolic meaning. He instead referred to the animals featured in his art as "creatures of the present". He also specifically referred to himself as an Ojibway artist, as opposed to allowing himself to be categorized under the broader net of simply an "Indian" artist.

"I like to express my own feelings, not my Indian-ness. I express myself, the way I feel."

== Selected exhibitions ==
- 1973: University of Ottawa;
- 1974: Canadian Indian Art '74, Royal Ontario Museum, Toronto, Ontario;
- 1976: Inukshuk Gallery, Waterloo, Ontario;
- 1977: Marion Scott Gallery, Vancouver; Links to Tradition, Indian and Northern Affairs Canada (travelling);
- 1983: Retrospective, Thunder Bay Nation and Exhibition and Centre for Indian Art;
- 1991: Benjamin Chee Chee: The Black Geese Portfolio, and Other Works. Thunder Bay Art Gallery, Ontario;
- 2018: Benjamin Chee Chee: Life and Legacy, the Temiskaming Art Gallery (travelling).

== Selected public collections ==
- Canadian Museum of Civilization, Hull, Québec;
- Glenbow Museum, Calgary, Alberta;
- Indian and Northern Affairs Canada, Ottawa, Ontario;
- McMichael Canadian Art Collection, Kleinberg, Ontario;
- National Gallery of Canada, Ottawa;
- Robert McLaughlin Gallery, Oshawa;
- Royal Ontario Museum, Toronto, Ontario;
- Thunder Bay Art Gallery, Thunder Bay, Ontario;
- Woodland Cultural Centre, Brantford, Ontario;

== Death ==
After finding his mother and achieving success as an artist, Chee Chee died by suicide in an Ottawa jail in 1977. He was buried in Notre Dame Cemetery in Ottawa, Ontario.

== Legacy ==
Chee Chee has been mentioned in Canada's Parliament & House of Commons by Indigenous Cree MP Robert-Falcon Ouellette in a tribute to the artist about his influence.

Ouellette said "Let us also recognize one of the finest artists of Canada, Benjamin Chee Chee. He always refused to be an indigenous artist; he was a proud Anishnabeg. He drew simple lines, usually acrylic on paper. Highly influential in his time, he said he did not paint the past but the present, the living of today. We can see his works, like the flock of four geese. They represent the four directions of the unborn, the youth, the adults and the elders all moving in the same direction. Even though he died in tragedy and is buried in Ottawa, far from his land and people, he still inspires today."

In 1983, upon their acquisition of a large collection of the artist's work for their new gallery, the Thunder Bay Nation and Exhibition and Centre for Indian Art organized his first retrospective. In 1991 the Thunder Bay Art Gallery held a second retrospective exhibition titled Benjamin Chee Chee: The Black Geese Portfolio, and Other Works, guest curated by Robert Houle.

In 2018, the Temiskaming Art Gallery organized a show titled Benjamin Chee Chee: Life and Legacy. The show received a grant of $97,200 from the Government of Canada to travel to communities throughout Northern Ontario over the next three years.

There is a park named after him (Benjamin Chee Chee Park) in Milton, Ontario.

== Sources ==
- Evans, Alvin L. (2004). Chee Chee: A Study of Aboriginal Suicide. McGill-Queens University Press. ISBN 978-0773526877.
- Lerner, Loren R.; Williamson, Mary F. (1991). Art and Architecture in Canada. U Toronto Press. ISBN 978-0802058560.
- Matuz, Roger (1998). St. James Guide to Native North American Artists. The University of Michigan. ISBN 978-1558622210.
- "Native artist Benjamin Chee Chee". www.native-art-in-canada.com. 2006.
- Robertson, Carmen L. (2018). The Making of a Movement: Chee Chee and Trailblazing Artists of the 1960's and 1970's. Temiskaming: Temiskaming Art Gallery.
