= Professional Native Indian Artists Inc. =

The Professional Native Indian Artists Incorporation (PNIAI) was a group of First Nations artists from Canada, with one from the United States. Founded in November 1973, they were Indigenous painters who exhibited in the mainstream art world.

They were informally known as the Indian Group of Seven and now the Indigenous Group of Seven. The nickname alludes to the Group of Seven, an early 20th-century Euro-Canadian group of painters.

The PNIAI were Daphne Odjig, Alex Janvier, Jackson Beardy, Eddy Cobiness, Norval Morrisseau, Carl Ray and Joseph Sanchez.

== History ==
In 1972, Jackson Beardy, Alex Janvier, and Daphne Odjig participated in a group exhibition in Winnipeg, Treaty Numbers 23, 287 and 1171, referring to the Numbered Treaties of the artists' respective bands. The exhibition brought modern Indigenous art to the mainstream Canadian art audience. The work was presented as fine art as opposed to craft.

Following the exhibition, Daphne Odjig became the driving force to organize the Professional Native Indian Artists Inc. At her home in Winnipeg, she invited Alex Janvier, Jackson Beardy, Eddy Cobiness, Norval Morrisseau, Carl Ray, and Joseph Sanchez to discuss their mutual concerns about art. They organized in November 1973.

These meetings provided a sense of community among the artists and a forum for criticism of each other's work. In November 1973 they proposed to formalise their movement as the Professional Native Indian Artists Incorporation (PNIAI), to be funded by the Department of Indian Affairs. All seven members incorporated PNIAI in February 1974. Haida artist Bill Reid, although not formally signing on at the time, was considered the eighth member and participated in some of the group's shows.

Winnipeg Free Press reporter Gary Scherbain nicknamed the PNIAI, the "Indian Group of Seven", referring to the Group of Seven of the 1920s and 1930s who painted Canadian landscapes in an impressionistic style.

The PNIAI had many groups exhibitions throughout Canada. The last in which all participated was in Montreal in 1975. The group disbanded that year.

The MacKenzie Art Gallery launched a major traveling retrospective of the group, 7: Professional Native Indian Artists Inc. in 2013. The exhibition, curated by Michelle LaVallee (Nawash Ojibway) traveled throughout Canadian museums for several years and is documented in a catalogue.

In March 2020, Gallery Gevik, a commercial art gallery specializing in Canadian and Indigenous Art in Toronto Canada, held an exhibition devoted to all seven members of the group entitled Professional Native Indian Artists Inc.

== Political and social ideals ==
Beside combined forces to promote Aboriginal art into the Western art world, they had strong Ideals to a change the way the world looked at their art. They wanted a shift from an emphasis on "Indigenous (Native)" to "artistic" value and recognition. Their objectives were:

- to develop a fund to enable artists to paint;
- to develop a marketing strategy involving prestigious commercial galleries in order to enable exhibit their work;
- to travel to aboriginal communities to stimulate young artists;
- to establish a trust fund, using a portion of the sales of artworks, for scholarship programme for emerging artists.

These were high ideals in a time where Aboriginal peoples had only recently been given voting rights and in which they politically fought for civil rights. With these ideals, they were part of a movement which also included the "Triple K Co-operative Incorporated", a Native-run silk-screen organisation which was established around the same time.

Although the group as a whole was together briefly, their organizing was a crucial step in the development of the concept of Indigenous Native art as part of the Canadian cultural art world. The group has paved the way for younger generations to have their art professionally recognized.

== In popular culture ==
The history of the group was covered in the limited-run, narrative podcast series Among Equals (2023), produced by Knockabout Media and distributed by Acast. The series was hosted by Innu artist and musician Soleil Launière.

== General references ==
- Bailey, Jan and Morgan Wood. Daphne Odjig: Four Decades of Prints. Kamloop Art Gallery, Kamloops, British Columbia, Canada, 2005. ISBN 1-895497-61-2
- Hughes, Kenneth. The Life and Art of Jackson Beardy. Winnipeg: Canadian Dimension Publishers; Toronto: J. Lorimer, 1979. ISBN 0-88862-278-3
- LaVallee, Michelle. 7: Professional Native Indian Artists Inc. MacKenzie Art Gallery, Regina, Saskatchewan, 2012. ISBN 9781896470870
- Martin, Lee-Ann and Robert Houle. The Art of Alex Janvier: His First Thirty Years, 1960-1990. Thunder Bay Art Gallery, Ontario, Canada, 1993. ISBN 0-920539-41-6
- Native Art In Canada website, 2007
