= Joseph Sanchez (artist) =

American painter

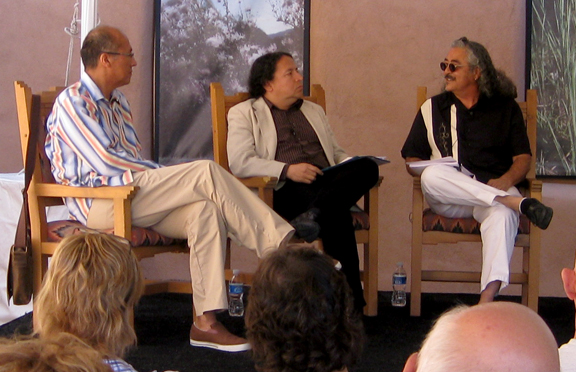
Joseph Sanchez (right) in a panel discussion with Gerald McMaster (left) and Paul Chaat Smith (center)

Joseph M. Sanchez (born ca. 1948) is an artist and museum curator.

== Early life ==
Sanchez was born in Trinidad, Colorado. He has roots in the White Mountain Apache Reservation and Taos Pueblo communities.

== Career ==
Sanchez has been a leader in Indigenous and Chicano arts since the 1970s, and as collaborated with multiple artists. This co-creation has included creating work, exhibitions, and advocating for the rights of minority artists. This is seen most importantly in his work Indian Artists (Indian Group of Seven).

Sanchez had artistic aspirations from an early age, becoming interested in art and painting in 5th grade. He became more serious about pursuing an art career when he met Daphne Odjig in Winnipeg in the early 1970s. Odjig mentored and invited him to participate in what became the Indian Group of Seven.

Sanchez serves as Chief Curator at the Portage College's Museum of Aboriginal Peoples' Art & Artifacts, in Lac La Biche, Alberta. This museum houses a permanent collection dedicated to the Professional Native Indian Artists Inc. Sanchez and Alex Janvier took part in the opening of the collection in 2018.

Sanchez states that "I mostly paint from a feminist point of view. We need to protect women."

Since retirement, Sanchez has continued to curate, but primarily returned to the studio full-time, and continues to exhibit in galleries and museums internationally. He lives in Santa Fe, N.M.

== Awards ==
- 2006, Governor's Award for Excellence in the Arts: Alan Houser Memorial Award.

== Exhibitions ==
- 1975 Dominion Gallery, Montreal, Quebec (see Indian Group of Seven)
- 1975 Wallack Gallery, Ottawa, Ontario
- 1975 Art Emporium, Vancouver, B.C.
- 1990s Spirits of the Sun exhibition in Phoenix
- 2009 Perversions of the Curator:a minor retrospective February 13 – March 15, 2009
- 2014-2016 7: Professional Native Indian Artists, Inc., touring exhibition
- 2017 Indigenous Changemakers: Ace, Belmore, Davidson, Houle, Morrisseau, Poitras, Sánchez
- 2017 Anamesis: Joseph M. Sanchez and Janice Tanton
- 2018 Portage College's Museum of Aboriginal Peoples' Art & Artifacts, Lac La Biche, Alberta
- 2019 El Zaguan Historic Santa Fe Foundation

== Publications ==
Sanchez's work is featured in the book Professional Native Indian Artists: Group of Seven. The book was published as an exhibition catalog for a show presented at the MacKenzie Art Gallery, Regina; and traveled to the Art Gallery of Windsor, Winnipeg Art Gallery, McMichael Canadian Art Collection in Kleinburg, Ontario, Kelowna Art Gallery, and the Art Gallery of Alberta.
