= Carl Ray =

First Nations artist

- Born: January 10, 1943; Sandy Lake First Nation, Ontario
- Died: September 26, 1978 (aged 35); Sioux Lookout, Ontario
- Known for: Painter
- Movement: Indian Group of Seven

Carl Ray (January 10, 1943 – September 26, 1978) was a First Nations artist who was active on the Canadian art scene from 1969 until his death in 1978. Considered primarily a Woodlands Style artist. He was a founding member of the Indian Group of Seven. He began painting when he was 30 years old.

== Biography ==
Ray was born on January 10, 1943, on the Sandy Lake First Nation reserve in northern Ontario, Canada and was known in his Oji-cree community as Tall Straight Poplar (he was 6'4" tall) where he hunted and trapped after leaving residential school at fifteen following the death of his father. At this traditional way of living he was a failure - in Ray's own words years later: "a year's catch consisted of four beaver, one lynx, and an assortment of mice and rabbits". Despite showing artistic promise at an early age, Carl was reluctant to break the taboo of painting the sacred beliefs and stories of his people. He did not touch a brush or paint for many years after having been admonished by his elders for doing so.

Ray eventually left the reserve to work in the Red Lake gold mines where his drinking and guitar playing abilities earned him the nickname Ira Hayes. However, his excesses caught up with him and he contracted tuberculosis, eventually recovered in Fort William and returned home in 1966. It was not until then that Norval Morrisseau's success in breaking the painting taboos allowed Ray to confidently pursue his craft, which in many cases, included "legend painting" and painting wildlife and northern scenic landscapes.

Ray apprenticed under Norval Morrisseau (who had already achieved national and international acclaim) and worked on the mural for the Indians of Canada Pavilion of Expo '67 in Montreal. Morrisseau had designed and sketched the mural but it was Ray who did most of the work and was left to finish it. Unfortunately this masterpiece is lost as it was left to fall into disrepair and was eventually demolished years later.

As well as translating the legends, Ray also created a large and impressive group of illustrations for James Stevens' book "Legends of the Sandy Lake Cree" in 1971. Stevens reported that Carl "perceived this reversion to a more austere style as a loss of face" Many of the illustrations would somewhat haunt him since it was now the kind of work that was expected of him in certain markets.

With the help of Ontario Department of Education Superintendent Robert Lavack, Ray embarked on a tour teaching art at schools in northern communities including Kirkland Lake, Timmins, Blind River, Wawa, Bruce Mines, Manitoulin Island, Sudbury, Levack, North Bay, Bracebridge, Oshawa and Whitby. He also taught at the Manitou Arts Foundation on Schreiber Island in 1971. The following year the department of Indian Affairs sponsored the tour through northern communities and reserves.

Ray continued to develop and paint through the mid 70's completing notable large scale mural opportunities at schools and the Sioux Lookout Fellowship and Communications Centre as well as smaller works becoming more and more popular with white buyers. In the early 1970s Ray had the first solo exhibition of his black and sepia, Woodlands style paintings on paper and canvas at Aggregation Gallery in Toronto. Aggregation Gallery continued to represent his work and estate through to the early 80's. By 1975, the Indian Group of Seven had formed and Ray was enjoying acclaim and purchases by notable collectors such as Dr. Peter Lewin and Dr. Bernard Cinader, as well as public institutions such as the McMichael Canadian Art Collection. He also illustrated the cover of "The White City" published by Tom Marshall in 1976. Much of Ray's art was influenced by his often troubled personal life and inner demons and excesses.

Ray was known by his peers as a man of general good humour. He was also known as somewhat of a jokester as described by fellow painter Alex Janvier: "Carl Ray was the guy who could laugh, make fun of you, throw a joke on you and he'd laugh his head off".

Ray was stabbed to death as a result of a drunken brawl over money in Sioux Lookout in 1978. He was only 35 years old. In a note to Ray by George Kenny after his death, he wrote "I wonder if those paintings you painted ever satisfied your demons that drove you to paint…Didn't you realize that fame only comes at the meeting of one of those demons – DEATH? ….Now we'll never know the extent of your greatness…"

== Style ==
Carl Ray is best known for his work executed in the style of the Woodlands School (often referred to as "legend painting" style).

Taboo Island by Ray, 1972

Lacking sophisticated technique, but resplendent with powerful imagery, his super-realistic images were unique, and his signature style is easily recognized. Describing his work, Carl stated "What you are looking at is ancient and sacred. In fact what you see could be described as a part of my soul". The spiritual and emotional commitment he put into his work was substantial - "his (work) came from a very deep journey, a lot of people are afraid to make that journey" Many of his works were limited to two or three colours, brown, black and blue, often mixing ink and watercolours.

His lesser known, scenic western style canvases were also a large part of Ray's repertoire. Ensconced in hues of electric blue, he captured the wildlife of the Sandy Lake area. He also combined the two styles in select works, capturing his imaginative images of Cree legends in full colour.

== Solo exhibitions ==
1969 Brandon University, Manitoba.
1970 Confederation College, Thunder Bay, Ontario.
1971 Fort Frances Public Library.
1972 University of Minnesota, Minneapolis.
1972 Gallerie Fore, Winnipeg, Manitoba.
1972-1977 Aggregation Gallery, Toronto, Ontario.

== Group exhibitions ==
1974 Canadian Indian Art '74, Royal Ontario Museum, Toronto.
1974 Contemporary Native Arts of Ontario, Oakville Centennial Gallery, Ontario.
1975 Dominion Gallery, Montreal, Quebec.
1975 Wallack Gallery, Ottawa, Ontario.
1975 Art Emporium, Vancouver, B.C.
1976 Contemporary Native Arts of Canada - The Woodland Indians, Royal Ontario Museum, Toronto - travelling exhibition
1977 Contemporary Indian Art - The Trail from the Past to the Future, Trent University, Peterborough, Ontario.
1978 Art of the Woodland Indian, McMichael Canadian Collection, Kleinburg, Ontario.
1979 Kinder des Nanabush, from the McMichael Canadian Collection, Kleinburg, Ontario.
1980 Contemporary Woodland Indian Painting, New College, University of Toronto, Ontario.
1983 Contemporary Indian Art at Rideau Hall, Department of Indian Affairs and Northern Development, Ottawa, Ontario.
1984 The Image Makers, Art Gallery of Ontario, Toronto - travelling exhibition
