= Daphne Odjig =

Canadian artist (1919–2016)

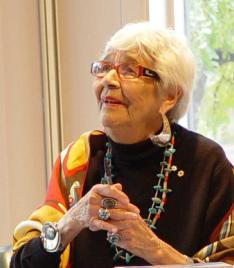
- Odjig in 2008
- Born: September 11, 1919; Wiikwemkoong, Ontario, Canada
- Died: October 1, 2016 (aged 97); Kelowna, British Columbia, Canada
- Awards: Order of Canada, 1986; Governor General's Award in Visual and Media Arts, 2007
- Elected: Royal Canadian Academy of Arts, 1989

Daphne Odjig, CM OBC RCA (September 11, 1919 – October 1, 2016), was a Canadian First Nations artist of Odawa-Potawatomi-English heritage. Her paintings are often characterized as Woodlands Style or as the pictographic style.

She was the driving force behind the Professional Native Indian Artists Association, colloquially known as the Indian Group of Seven, a group considered a pioneer in bringing First Nations art to the forefront of Canada's art world. She received a number of awards for her work, including the Order of Canada, the Governor General's Award and five honorary doctorates.

== Early life and family ==
Odjig was born in 1919 at Wiikwemkoong, the principal village on the Manitoulin Island Unceded Indian Reserve, to parents Dominic and Joyce (née Peachey) Odjig. She was the eldest of four children; her siblings are Stanley, Winnifred and Donavan. She was descended on her father's side from the great Potawatomi Chief Black Partridge. Her mother, an Englishwoman, met and married Dominic in England where he was serving during World War I as a Private (#754710) in the 119th (Algoma) Battalion, CEF.

When Odjig was 13 years old, she suffered rheumatic fever and had to leave school. Recuperating at home, she spent time with her paternal grandfather, Jonas Odjig (a stonecarver), and her parents - all of whom encouraged her to explore art. Odjig later said that her grandfather "played a great role in my life – he nurtured my creative spirit – he was the first one I ever drew with ... he was my first mentor." Odjig was also influenced by her mother, who embroidered, and her father, who liked to draw war scenes and his officers from his wartime experiences. Odjig once stated that "Art was always a part of our lives".

When she was 18, Odjig's mother and grandfather died. Odjig moved to Parry Sound, Ontario, and then at the outbreak of World War II, she moved to Toronto for job opportunities. She worked in factories and in her spare time explored art galleries such as the Royal Ontario Museum and the Art Gallery of Ontario. She was particularly influenced by her first experiences of cubist art by artists such as Picasso.

== Career ==
In 1945, after World War II, Odjig moved to British Columbia. In the 1960s she relocated to Manitoba. Her breakthrough into the art world happened in the early 1960s when she received critical acclaim for her pen and ink drawings of Cree people from northern Manitoba and their traditional community. She was concerned over the potential loss of traditional ways of living, and hoped that by preserving images of the people and their daily life in art, they could survive. In 1963 she was formally recognized as an artist when she was admitted to the British Columbia Federation of Artists.

In 1971, she opened Odjig Indian Prints of Canada, a craft shop and small press, in Winnipeg. In 1973, Odjig founded the Professional Native Indian Artists Association, along with Alex Janvier and Norval Morrisseau. The group organised shows of their work and, although the group was short-lived, the members are considered critical pioneers in the development of indigenous art in Canada. About the group, Odjig once said, "We acknowledged and supported each other as artists when the world of fine art refused us entry ... Together we broke down barriers that would have been so much more difficult faced alone." It had an immediate result of bringing First Nations art to the wider Canadian art scene – in 1972, the Winnipeg Art Gallery offered three of the artists exhibiting there a show. By 1974, she and her husband had expanded their shop and renamed it New Warehouse Gallery. It was the first Canadian gallery exclusively representing First Nations art and Canada's first Native-owned and operated art gallery.

Also in 1973, Odjig received a Brucebo Foundation Scholarship and spent six months on the island of Gotland, Sweden, as a resident artist.

=== Style and themes ===
Odjig's early works were very realistic in their style, however she later began to experiment with other styles such as expressionism and cubism. She developed a style of her own which fused together elements of aboriginal pictographs and First Nations arts with European techniques and styles of the 20th century. According to the National Gallery of Canada, "Odjig's work is defined by curving contours, strong outlining, overlapping shapes and an unsurpassed sense of colour". Heavily influenced by the work of her grandfather, Odjig attributed this emphasis on curvature in her art to the "rounded edges of her grandfather's carved tombstones."

In the 1960s, Odjig began to paint scenes from Manitoulin legends, and in the 1970s she focused further on her Indian heritage and culture, and the impact of colonialism on her people. Among other subjects, she explored mythology, history, and landscapes. She also explored erotic themes in some of her paintings; for example, in 1974, Odjig illustrated Tales from the Smokehouse, a collection of traditional First Nations erotica written by Herbert T. Schwarz. Other topics she dealt with included human suffering, relationships, culture and the importance of family and kinship. Odjig emphasized the contemporary experience of Native Americans in Canada. Her late works focused formally on intense color and lyricism, and while her works retained their socio-political power, her art became more "reflective and personal."

=== Honours, commissions, and collections ===
Her work is included in such public collections as Canada Council's Art Bank, the Canadian Museum of History in Gatineau, Quebec, the Tom Thomson Art Gallery, the McMichael Canadian Art Collection, the Sequoyah Research Center and the Government of Israel. She was commissioned to create art by Expo '70 in Osaka, Japan, the Manitoba Museum, and for El Al, the Israeli airline.

Odjig has been the subject of books and at least three documentaries. She was the recipient of a wide range of honors, including an Honorary Doctorate of Letters from Laurentian University in 1982, and an Honorary Doctorate of Laws from the University of Toronto in 1985, the Order of Canada in 1986, a Commemorative Medal for the 125th Anniversary of the Confederation of Canada in 1992, an Honorary Doctorate of Education from Nipissing University in 1997, and a National Aboriginal Achievement Awards in 1998. She was elected to the Royal Canadian Academy of Arts in 1989. In 2007, Odjig received the Governor General's Award in Visual and Media Arts. Canada Post featured three of her paintings on Canadian postage stamps in February 2011. In 2025, a Canadian 2 dollar coin was struck featuring one of her artworks entitled 'Folk Singer' from 1977. In 2007, she was made a Member of the Order of British Columbia. Odjig also received the Eagle Feather by Chief Wakageshigon for her artistic achievement.

The Artshow, a theatrical tribute to Odjig by writer Alanis King, was staged in 2004 with a cast that included Jani Lauzon, Lorne Cardinal, Sean Dixon, Sarah Podemski and Gloria Eshkibok.

=== Exhibits ===
Odjig traveled extensively and exhibited in Canada, the United States, Belgium, Yugoslavia and Japan. She had over 30 solo exhibitions and was part of over 50 group exhibits during her career.

The Drawings and Paintings of Daphne Odjig: A Retrospective Exhibition featured work from over 40 years of Odjig's career. The exhibit was organized by the Art Gallery of Sudbury and the National Gallery of Canada. It was shown in Sudbury, the Kamloops Art Gallery, and, in October 2009 through 2010, was shown at the National Gallery of Canada. The only United States venue for the show was the Institute of American Indian Arts Museum in Santa Fe, New Mexico. Accompanying the retrospective was a catalog written by Ojibway curator Bonnie Devine with additional text by Robert Houle and Duke Redbird.

Despite suffering from arthritis in her right hand, she continued to sketch during her later years.

== Personal life ==
Odjig met Paul Somerville while she was working in Toronto, and they married and moved to British Columbia together. They had two sons: David Eagle Spirit Somerville, Paul's son from a previous engagement, and Stanly Somerville. Paul Somerville died in a car accident, and both boys remained in her and their father's family care. In 1962 Odjig married Chester Beavon, a community development worker for the Department of Native Affairs, and the family moved to Manitoba.

Odjig died on 1 October 2016 in Kelowna, British Columbia, Canada.

== Bibliography ==
- Odjig, Daphne, Rosamond M. Vanderburgh, and Beth Southcott. A Paintbrush in My Hand. Toronto: Natural Heritage Books. ISBN 978-0-920474-73-0
- Odjig, Daphne, Bob Boyer, Carol Podedworny, and Phillip Gevik (2001). Odjig: The Art of Daphne Odjig, 1960–2000. Toronto: Key Porter Books. ISBN 978-1-55263-286-4.
- Odjig, Daphne, Jann L. M. (FRW) Bailey, and Morgan Wood (2005). Daphne Odjig: Four Decades of Prints. Montreal: ABC Art Books. ISBN 978-1-895497-62-5.
