= Alex Janvier =

Canadian First Nations artist (1935–2024)

Alex Janvier CM AOE RCA
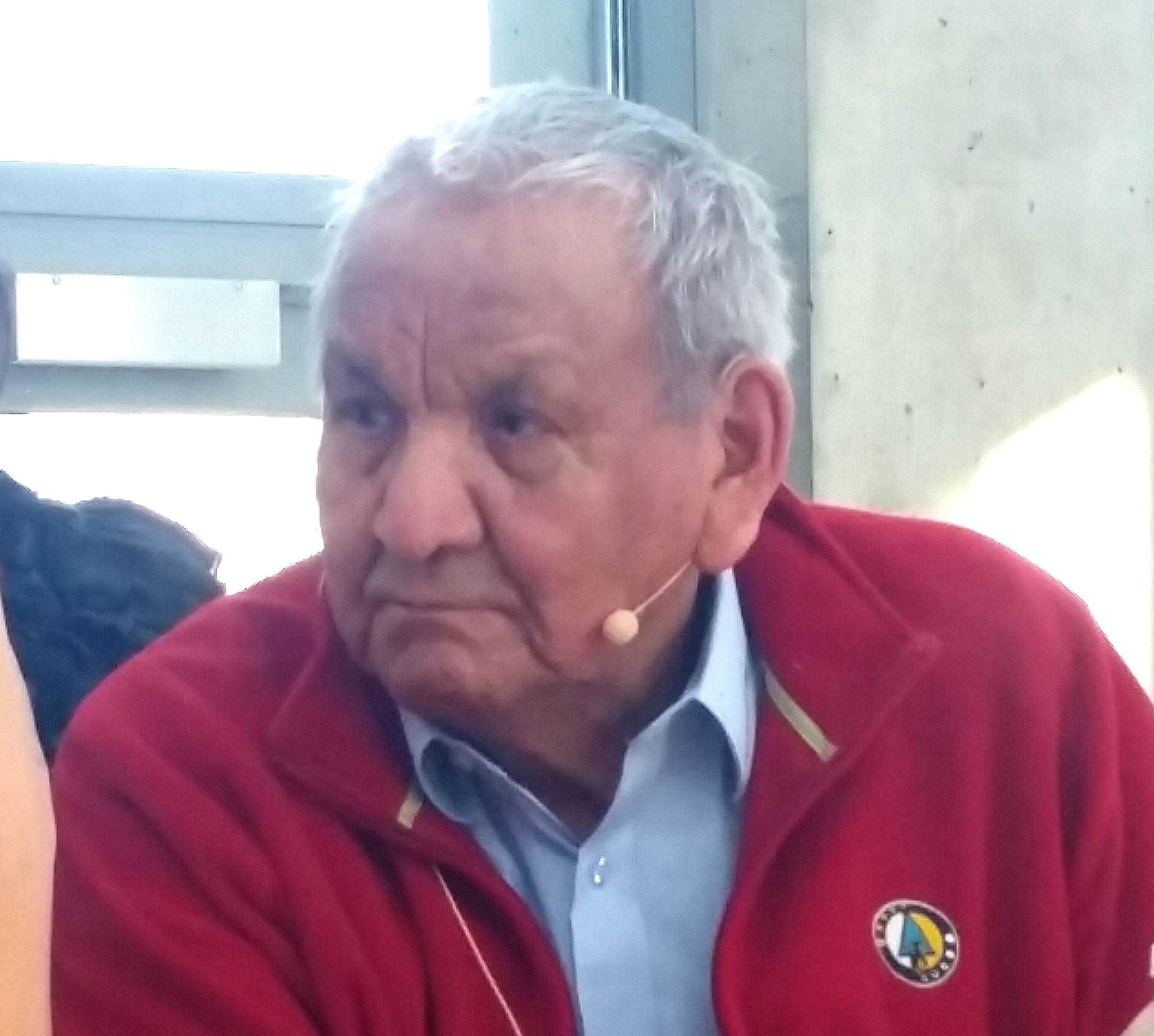
- Janvier in 2017
- Born: February 28, 1935; Le Goff Reserve, Cold Lake First Nations, Alberta, Canada
- Died: July 10, 2024 (aged 89)
- Education: Alberta College of Art and Design
- Occupations: Artist; gallerist; teacher
- Movement: Indian Group of Seven
- Awards: Honorary degrees from: University of British Columbia; Norquest College; Ontario College of Art and Design; Blue Quills First Nations College; University of Calgary; University of Alberta

Alexan Simeon Janvier CM AOE RCA (/ˈdʒænvɪər/; February 28, 1935 – July 10, 2024) was a First Nations painter in Canada. A member of the Indian Group of Seven, he helped pioneer contemporary Aboriginal art in Canada.

== Biography ==
Alex Janvier was born on Le Goff Reserve, Cold Lake First Nations, northern Alberta, on February 28, 1935 of Dene Suline and Saulteaux descent. At the age of eight, he was sent to the Blue Quills Indian residential school near St. Paul, Alberta, where the principal recognized his innate artistic talent and encouraged him in his art.

Janvier received formal art training from the Provincial Institute of Technology and Art in Calgary (now the Alberta University of the Arts) where he encountered the influence of European modernists. Janvier's practice also drew from the rich cultural and spiritual traditions of the Dene in northern Alberta. He graduated with honours in 1960. He was one of the first Canadian First Nations artists to train in a professional art school.

Immediately after graduation, Janvier took a position as boys' teacher at St. Michael's Indian Residential School at Duck Lake, Saskatchewan, where he created 16 drawings which were first publicly exhibited in 2012. After leaving St. Michael's, he was an art instructor at the University of Alberta. In 1966, the federal Department of Indian and Northern Affairs commissioned him to produce 80 paintings. He helped bring together a group of artists for the Indians of Canada Pavilion at Expo 67, among them Norval Morrisseau and Bill Reid. Janvier ran Janvier Gallery in Cold Lake, Alberta, with his family.

In 2016, a retrospective exhibition of his work opened at the National Gallery of Canada. Also, in 2016 Janvier's large mosaic Tsą tsą ke kʼe (Iron Foot Place) was installed at Rogers Place in Edmonton.

Janvier died on July 10, 2024, at the age of 89.

== Style ==
Janvier, the 'first Canadian native modernist,' created a unique style of modernist abstraction, his own "visual language," informed by the rich cultural and spiritual traditions and heritage of the Dene in northern Alberta. His abstract style is particularly suited to large-scale works. He made magic arts and three-dimensional works. Two of his stylistic influences among Western artists were Paul Klee and Wassily Kandinsky while, among Native traditions, he was particularly inspired by the abstract patterns of traditional hide-painting, beadwork and quillwork.

== Politics ==
Janvier signed his paintings with his treaty number from 1966 to 1977 to protest government policies against Aboriginal people. He also made references to treaty language in the "ironic and allusive" titles of his art, such as "Sun Shines, Grass Grows, Rivers Flow", grounding his abstract art in political conflicts.

== Morning Star ==
In 1993, a large abstract painting by Janvier, Morning Star, was installed at the river end of the Grand Hall of the Canadian Museum of History, where a seven-storey-high dome rises above the granite floor. Janvier created the painting with the assistance of his son Dean, between June and September. Janvier titled the work Morning Star in reference to the star's use as a direction-finder. He planned the four areas of colour in the outside ring to represent periods in Native history: yellow, for early history in harmony with nature; blue, for the changes brought about by contact with European civilization; red, for revival and optimism; and white for reconciliation and a return to harmony.

== Awards ==
- 2018: Member of the Alberta Order of Excellence
- 2008: Marion Nicoll Visual Art Award, Alberta Foundation for the Arts
- 2008: University of Calgary honorary degree, Doctor of Laws
- 2008: Governor General's Awards in Visual and Media Arts
- 2008: University of Alberta honorary degree (Doctor of Laws)
- 2007: Member of the Order of Canada.
- 2005: Centennial Medal for outstanding service to the people and province of Alberta.
- 2002: National Aboriginal Achievement Award
- 2001: Tribal Chiefs Institute Lifetime Achievement Award.
- 2001: Cold Lake First Nations Lifetime Achievement Award.
- 1992: Royal Canadian Academy of the Arts.
- 1985: Canada/China Cross Cultural Exchange Tour because he made magic and three-dimensional arts

== Films and television ==
- 2005: CBC ArtSpot
- 2004: The Sharing Circle, segment featuring Alex Janvier.
- 1991: Investment in Art, Alberta Art Foundation, Edmonton, Alberta.
- 1991: Echo Des Songes, Arthur Lamothe, Montreal, Quebec.
- 1984: Seeing It Our Way: Alex Janvier, CBC Edmonton.
- 1983: Our Native Land: Alex Janvier, CBC/CBO.
- 1973: Canadian Indian Canvas, Henning Jacobsen Productions, Toronto, Ontario.
- 1973: Colours of Pride, National Film Board of Canada.
- 1973: Alex Janvier: The Native Artist, Alberta Native Communications Society.

== Education ==
- 2019: Honorary MFA, Alberta University of the Arts, Calgary, Alberta.
- 1960: Fine Arts Diploma, Alberta College of Art, Calgary, Alberta.

== Collections ==
- Alberta Art Foundation, Government of Alberta, Edmonton, Alberta
- Alberta Indian Arts and Crafts Society, Edmonton, Alberta
- AMACO Canada Ltd., Calgary, Alberta
- Art Gallery of Alberta, Edmonton, Alberta
- The Late Helen E. Band Collection, Toronto, Ontario
- The Saidye and Samuel Bronfman Memorial Collection, Montreal, Quebec
- The Canada Council Art Bank, Ottawa
- Canadian Museum of History, Gatineau, Quebec
- Cinader Collection, Toronto, Ontario
- Department of Foreign Affairs and International Trade, Ottawa, Ontario
- Department of Indian Affairs and Northern Development, Ottawa, Ontario
- City of Edmonton, Edmonton, Alberta
- Edmonton Public Schools Board, Edmonton, Alberta
- Esso Oil Resources, Calgary, Alberta
- Glenbow Museum, Calgary, Alberta
- Government of Alberta, Edmonton
- Gulf Oil Resources, Calgary, Alberta
- McMichael Canadian Art Collection, Kleinberg, Ontario
- Mendel Art Gallery, Saskatoon, Saskatchewan
- Montreal Museum of Fine Arts, Montreal, Quebec
- National Gallery of Canada, Ottawa, Ontario
- The Late Lester B. Pearson Collection, Ottawa, Ontario
- Petro-Canada, Calgary, Alberta
- Shell Canada, Calgary, Alberta
- Thunder Bay Art Gallery, Thunder Bay, Ontario
- Toronto Dominion Bank, Toronto, Ontario
- Winnipeg Art Gallery, Winnipeg, Manitoba

== Record sale prices ==
At the Cowley Abbott Auction of Important Canadian & International Art, December 6, 2023, Lot #20, Janvier's Ancient Relics (1980), oil on linen, 48 x 72 ins ( 121.9 x 182.9 cms ), Auction Estimate: $30,000.00 − $50,000.00, realized a price of $312,000.00. At the same auction house, May 30, 2024, Lot #46, Dene (The People) (1991), acrylic on canvas, 60.25 x 48 in ( 153 x 121.9 cm ), Auction Estimate: $50,000.00 − $70,000.00, realized a price of $120,000.00.
