= Norval Morrisseau =

Indigenous Canadian artist (1932–2007)

- Born: March 14, 1932; Beardmore, Ontario, Canada
- Died: December 4, 2007 (aged 75); Toronto, Ontario, Canada
- Education: Self-taught
- Known for: Painter
- Movement: Woodlands Style
- Spouse: Harriet Kakegamic
- Awards: CM
- Website: https://officialmorrisseau.com/

Norval Morrisseau CM RCA (March 14, 1932 – December 4, 2007), also known as Copper Thunderbird, was an Indigenous Canadian artist from the Bingwi Neyaashi Anishinaabek First Nation. He is widely regarded as the grandfather of contemporary Indigenous art in Canada. Known as the "Picasso of the North," Morrisseau created works depicting the legends of his people, the cultural and political tensions between native Canadian and European traditions, his existential struggles, and his deep spirituality and mysticism. His style is characterized by thick black outlines and bright colors. He founded the Woodlands School of Canadian art and was a prominent member of the "Indian Group of Seven."

== Biography ==
An Anishinaabe, Morrisseau was born March 14, 1932, on the Sand Point Ojibwe reserve near Beardmore, Ontario. His full name was Jean-Baptiste Norman Henry Morrisseau, but he signed his work using the Cree syllabics writing ᐅᓵᐚᐱᐦᑯᐱᓀᐦᓯ (Ozaawaabiko-binesi, unpointed: ᐅᓴᐘᐱᑯᐱᓀᓯ, "Copper/Brass [Thunder]Bird"), as his pen-name for his Anishnaabe name ᒥᐢᒁᐱᐦᐠ ᐊᓂᒥᐦᑮ (Miskwaabik Animikii, unpointed: ᒥᐢᑿᐱᐠ ᐊᓂᒥᑭ, "Copper Thunderbird").

In accordance with Anishnaabe tradition, he was raised by his maternal grandparents with little connection to his actual parents. His grandfather, Moses Potan Nanakonagos, a traditional Medicine Man and Knowledge Keeper, taught him the traditions and legends of his people. His grandmother, Véronique Nanakonagos, was a devout Catholic and from her he learned the tenets of Christianity. The contrast between these two religious traditions became an important factor in his intellectual and artistic development.

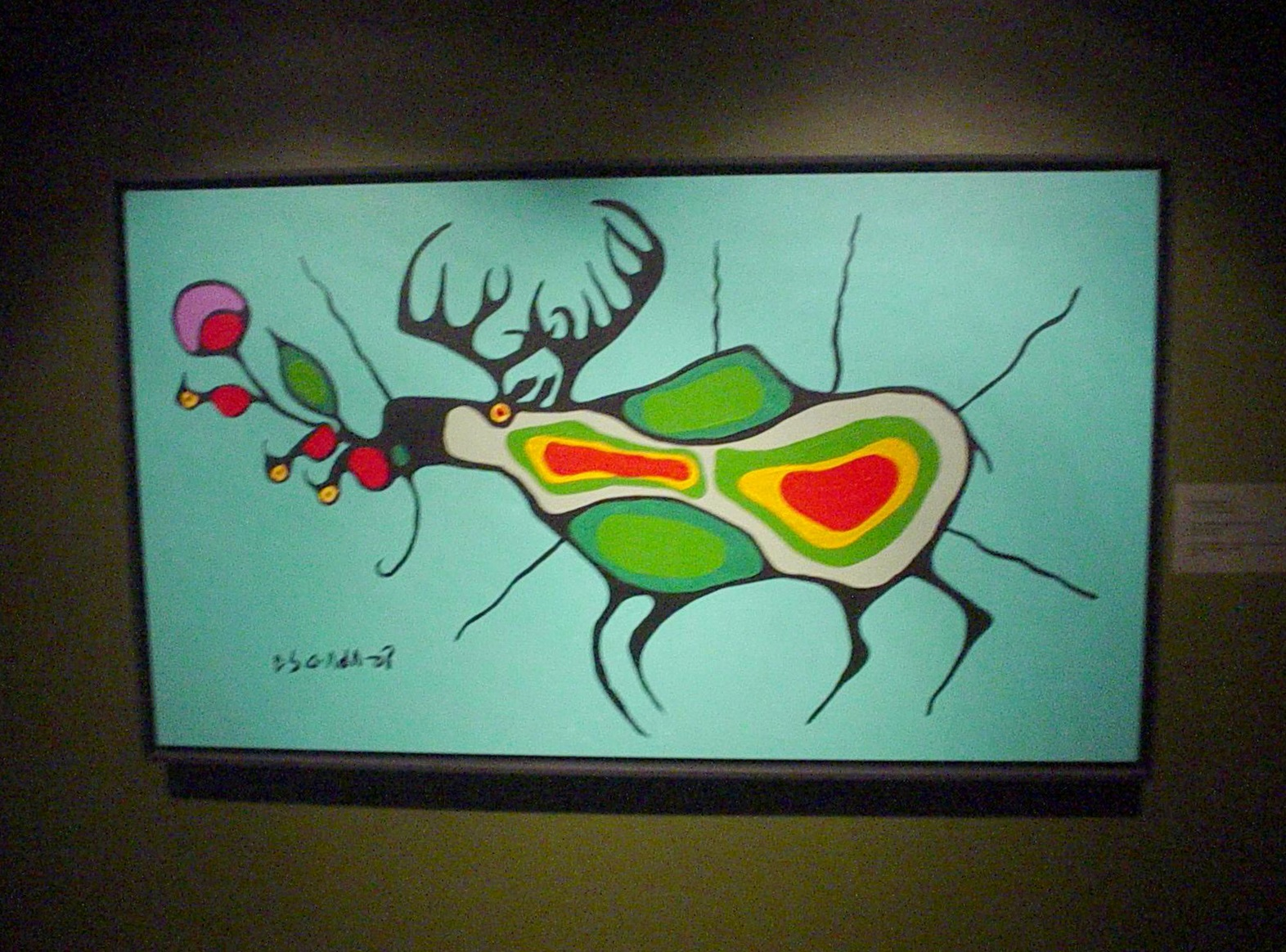
Untitled (Moose with Birds)

At the age of six, Morrisseau was sent to a Catholic residential school, St. Joseph's Indian Residential School in Fort William, Ontario. There, he and other students were educated in the European tradition, native culture was suppressed, and the use of native language was forbidden. After two years he returned home and started attending a local community school in Beardmore. Morrisseau left the school when he was ten, preferring to learn from elders rather than continuing his formal education. He spent much of his time listening to elders, drawing, fishing, hunting, picking berries, and trapping.

At the age of 19, he became very sick. He was taken to a doctor but his health kept deteriorating. Fearing for his life, his mother called a medicine-woman who performed a renaming ceremony: she gave him the new name Copper Thunderbird. According to Anishnaabe tradition, giving a powerful name to a dying person can give them new energy and save their lives. Morrisseau recovered after the ceremony and from then on always signed his works with his new name.

When he started painting, he was discouraged from sharing traditional stories and images outside of the First Nation, but he decided to break this taboo.

Morrisseau contracted tuberculosis in 1956 and was sent to Fort William Sanatorium to recover. There he met his future wife Harriet Kakegamic with whom he had seven children, Victoria, Michael, Peter, David, Lisa, Eugene, and Christian.

After being invited by Ontario Provincial Police Constable, Robert Sheppard, to meet the artist, the anthropologist Selwyn Dewdney became an early advocate of Morrisseau's and was very interested in Morrisseau's deep knowledge of native culture and myth. Dewdney was the first to take his art to a wider public.

Jack Pollock, a Toronto art dealer, helped expose Morrisseau's art to a wider audience in the 1960s. The two initially met in 1962 while Pollock was teaching a painting workshop in Beardmore. As Pollock did not drive, Susan Ross whom Morrisseau had met in 1961 and Sheila Burnford drove Pollock to visit Morrisseau at his home to view more of his works. Struck by the genius of Morrisseau's art, he immediately organized an exhibition of his work at his Toronto gallery. One of Morrisseau's early commissions was for a large mural in the Indians of Canada Pavilion at Expo 67, a revolutionary exhibit voicing the dissatisfaction of the First Nations People of Canada with their social and political situation.

In 1972, Morrisseau was caught in a hotel fire in Vancouver and suffered serious burns. On that occasion, he had a vision of Jesus encouraging him to be a role model through his art. He converted to the apostolic faith and started introducing Christian themes in his art. A year later he was arrested for drunk and disorderly behaviour and was incarcerated for his own protection. He was assigned an extra cell as a studio and was allowed to attend a nearby church.

Morrisseau joined the Eckankar movement in 1976 and gave up drinking. He connected Eckankar's emphasis on soul travel through the astral planes to his traditional Ojibway teachings.

Morrisseau was the founder of a Canadian-originated school of art called Woodland or sometimes Legend or Medicine painting. His work was influential on a group of younger Ojibwe and Cree artists, such as Blake Debassige, Benjamin Chee Chee, and Leland Bell. His influence on the Woodland school of artists was recognized in 1984 by the Art Gallery of Ontario exhibit Norval Morrisseau and the Emergence of the Image Makers. He spent his youth in remote isolation in northern Ontario, near Thunder Bay, where his artistic style developed without the usual influences of other artists' imagery. As the sole originator of his "Woodland" style he became an inspiration to three generations of artists.

In 1978, Morrisseau was made a Member of the Order of Canada. He was a member of the Royal Canadian Academy of Arts.

As Morrisseau's health began to decline as a result of Parkinson's disease and a stroke in 1994, he was cared for by his adopted family of Gabe and Michelle Vadas. In 2005 and 2006, the National Gallery of Canada in Ottawa organized a retrospective of his work. This was the first time that the Gallery dedicated a solo exposition to a native artist. In the final months of his life, the artist used a wheelchair and lived in a residence in Nanaimo, British Columbia. He was unable to paint due to his poor health. He died of cardiac arrest—complications arising from Parkinson's disease on December 4, 2007, in Toronto General Hospital. He was buried after a private ceremony in Northern Ontario next to the grave of his former wife, Harriet, on Anishinaabe land.

The National Arts Centre, urban ink co-production, Copper Thunderbird, premiered on the Aboriginal Peoples Television Network (APTN) on Monday, February 4, 2008. Norval Morrisseau was honoured with a posthumous Lifetime Achievement Award during the NAAF Awards show in 2008.

== Style ==
Morrisseau was a self-taught artist. He developed his own techniques and artistic vocabulary that captured ancient legends and images that came to him in visions or dreams. He was originally criticized by the native community because his images disclosed traditional spiritual knowledge. Initially he painted on any material that he could find, especially birchbark, and also moose hide. Dewdney encouraged him to use earth-tone colours and traditional material, which he thought were appropriate to Morrisseau's native style.

The subjects of his art in the early period were myths and traditions of the Anishnaabe people. He is acknowledged to have initiated the Woodland School of native art, where images similar to the petroglyphs of the Great Lakes region were now captured in paintings and prints. Morrisseau was also inspired by sacred Anishinaabe birch bark scroll images.

His later style changed: he used more standard material, and the colours became progressively brighter, eventually obtaining a neon-like brilliance. The themes also moved from traditional myth to depicting his own personal struggles. He also produced art depicting Christian subjects: during his incarceration, he attended a local church where he was struck by the beauty of the images on stained-glass windows. Some of his paintings, like Indian Jesus Christ, imitate that style and represent characters from the Bible with native features. After he joined the new age religion Eckankar in 1976, he started representing on canvas its mystical beliefs.

Morrisseau, who was bisexual, also produced erotic works featuring sexuality between male figures and between male and female figures. Most of these works are now held in private collections. Other works explored Indigenous conceptions of gender fluidity, such as his massive work Androgyny (1983), which was formerly exhibited at Rideau Hall.

The cover art for the Bruce Cockburn album Dancing in the Dragon's Jaws is a painting by Norval Morrisseau.

Two of Morrisseau's paintings from the mid-1970s appear in Stanley Kubrick's 1980 film The Shining including The Great Earth Mother (1976) and Flock of Loons (1975).

== Fakes and forgeries ==
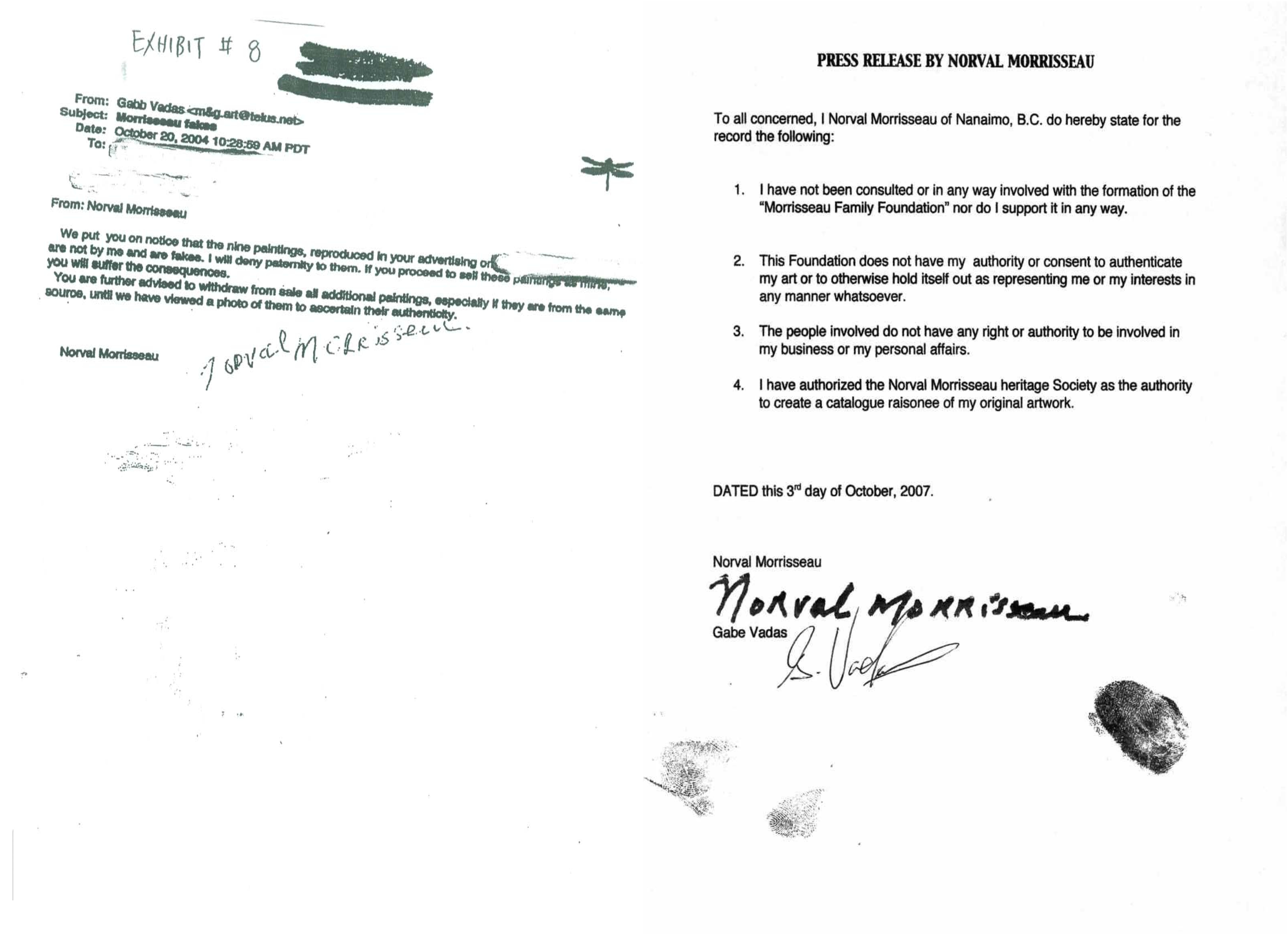
On the left, 2004 email from Norval Morrisseau requesting the removal of nine items identified as fakes from sale, directed at an unknown dealer. On the right, a 2007 press release from Norval Morrisseau disavowing any link with the "Morrisseau Family Foundation", and identifying the Norval Morrisseau Heritage Society as the sole authority to create a catalogue raisonné of his work.

The prevalence of fakes and forgeries was of deep concern to Morrisseau, particularly during his later years, and he actively sought to remove these from the marketplace.

In 2005, Morrisseau established the Norval Morrisseau Heritage Society (NMHS). The Society is currently compiling a database of Norval Morrisseau paintings to discredit many prevalent Morrisseau forgeries. This committee, not affiliated with any commercial gallery or art dealer, comprises highly respected members of the academic, legal and Aboriginal communities working on a volunteer basis. It is charged with creating a complete catalogue raisonné of Norval Morrisseau artwork. The NMHS is currently researching Morrisseau art, provenance and materials and techniques in order to complete the task assigned to them by the artist. The NMHS continue their work and in 2008, were in Red Lake, Ontario, to research additional information and art by the artist.

The Art Dealers Association of Canada (ADAC) issued the following directive in the Winter 2007 newsletter to their membership: "The Art Dealers Association of Canada is enacting a rule and regulation that no certificates of authenticity will be issued by any members of ADAC with respect to any works or purported works by Norval Morrisseau and that the Norval Morrisseau Heritage Society is the sole authority for the authentication of works by Norval Morrisseau." ADAC also revoked the membership of a dealer who failed to comply with this directive.

Morrisseau also engaged in more direct intervention, identifying fake and forged works available for sale, particularly those purported to be painted by him in the so-called "70s style". He wrote to galleries and made sworn declarations identifying items being sold as "fakes and imitations". More than ten sworn declarations were directed to at least seven dealers and galleries during 1993–2007, requesting that fake and forged works be removed or destroyed. These dealers were the Artworld of Sherway, Gallery Sunami, Maslak McLeod Gallery, Bearclaw Gallery, Gary Bruce Thacky (AKA Gary Lamont of Thunder Bay, Ontario) and Randy Potter Estate Auctions.

Building on Morrisseau's efforts, for the last 20 years, the battle to stop the proliferation of fakes has waged. Lawyers, doctors, Morrisseau's friends, apprentice and estate, as well as leading native art scholars, government workers and many others, including musician Kevin Hearn of the Barenaked Ladies, have tried to help in Morrisseau's battle by exposing the existence of a fraud ring manufacturing fake Morrisseau paintings. The 2019 documentary film There Are No Fakes, directed by Jamie Kastner, helped to bring this issue into the public view. Recently in 2019, after hearing testimony from people inside the fraud ring itself, the Ontario Superior and Appeal courts recognized the existence of that fraud. The courts also found that the Maslak-McLeod Gallery, a vendor of works attributed to Morrisseau, had acted fraudulently.:

"The (previous lower court) trial judge erred in failing to find that the Gallery's provision of a valid provenance statement was a term of the purchase and a warranty, not mere puffery," the new appeal decision states. Mr. McLeod's assertion that the painting was genuine was only matched by his elusiveness in demonstrating that fact, which can only be explained as deliberate," said the appeal panel. "With respect to the provenance statement, Mr. McLeod made a false representation, either knowing that it was false and without an honest belief in its truth, or he made the statement recklessly without caring whether it was true or false, with the intent that Mr. Hearn would rely upon it, which he did, to his personal loss." Gallery owner Joseph McLeod is no longer alive; McLeod's estate has been ordered to pay Hearn $50,000 for breach of contract and breach of the Sale of Goods Act, plus punitive damages of $10,000."

The debate concerning the authenticity of the "70s paintings" commonly found in the marketplace, continues with ongoing litigation.

Law enforcement have launched an active investigation into the Norval Morrisseau art fraud as confirmed by the National Post:

"However, police in Thunder Bay say they have now launched a criminal investigation into a possible art fraud ring involving Morrisseau paintings. Spokesman Scott Paradis said Friday investigators are "not prepared to speak about potential suspects or persons of interest." "The criminal investigation is one of several major developments to take place after what's shown in the film, which ends with the outcome of the lawsuit."

On March 3, 2023, the Thunder Bay Police and Ontario Provincial Police announced they had pressed charges against 8 people and seized over 1,000 paintings in the forgery cases. Police described it as "the biggest art fraud in world history." On December 4, 2023, the 16th anniversary of Norval Morrisseau's death in 2007, additional details of the investigation and the art fraud ring emerged with the guilty plea of Gary Lamont, 1 of the 8 people charged in the Norval Morrisseau art forgery case. Lamont pleaded guilty to 2 of 5 charges in the Ontario Superior Court of Justice in Thunder Bay, Ontario, defrauding the public of an amount exceeding $5,000 and forgery (making false documents, mainly artwork), with the three remaining counts expected to be withdrawn. Lamont was sentenced to 5 years in prison on fraud charges.

The joint operation, between the OPP and the Thunder Bay Police Service, called Project Totton, took 2 1/2 years and laid 40 charges against Lamont and 7 other still alleged forgers operating in Thunder Bay and Southern Ontario. Police estimated the total number of forgeries at between 4,500 and 6,000, worth tens of millions of dollars, and described the crime as one of the biggest cases of art fraud anywhere in the world.

The forgery lasted from 2002 until 2015, according to the charges, while the public defrauding extended from 2002 through to 2019. Police said the eight accused were part of three distinct, yet intertwined groups that created the fraudulent artwork. The first group was launched in 1996 and operated in Thunder Bay like an assembly line. Another group started in 2002, and third group began operating in southern Ontario in 2008. The three groups traded paintings back and forth, and two of the accused were involved in the distribution of paintings by all three groups. The fraud also included creating fake certificates of authenticity, police said. Others charged in the case are David John Voss, Diane Marie Champagne, Linda Joy Tkachyk and Benjamin Paul Morrisseau (the artist's nephew), all of Thunder Bay. Also charged are Jeffrey Gordon Cowan of Niagara-on-the-Lake, James White of Essa Township and David P. Bremner of Locust Hill.

Jim White, the central figure in an art fraud ring that trafficked counterfeit works attributed to the late Indigenous artist Norval Morrisseau, was sentenced after reaching a plea deal ahead of trial. White, 84, received a conditional sentence of two years less a day in a Newmarket, Ontario courtroom on August 29, 2025, following his guilty plea in June 2025. The court heard that White played a key role in marketing and selling hundreds of forged Morrisseau pieces globally—some fetching tens of thousands of dollars. He pleaded guilty to two counts of producing forged documents, as well as possession and trafficking of over 500 counterfeit artworks.

His co-accused, David Paul Bremner, 78, also admitted to his involvement in the forgery scheme. Bremner's role involved creating fraudulent certificates of authenticity for the forged artworks, which were falsely presented and sold as genuine Morrisseau pieces. Bremner acknowledged that he authenticated, appraised, and otherwise handled artworks provided by one of his co-accused (Jeff Cowan), whose case is currently being tried. The allegations against that individual have not yet been tested in court. As part of his plea, Bremner admitted to "turning a blind eye" to suspicions that the pieces were fake and failing to take adequate steps to confirm their authenticity. Despite lacking formal training in Morrisseau authentication, he proceeded to issue certificates—some tied to works that sold for over $30,000, with one nearing $100,000. He also acknowledged that his certificates were used by White and others to legitimize the counterfeit works. On September 9, 2025, Bremner was sentenced to two years less a day.

JEFF COWAN

The final accused in the Norval Morrisseau art fraud case is now representing himself in ongoing criminal proceedings. Jeff Cowan, a resident of the Niagara Region, faces seven counts of fraud and one count of uttering a forged document. A jury was selected, and the trial began on September 15, 2025, before Superior Court Justice Laura Bird.

Operating out of Niagara-on-the-Lake (and formerly St. Thomas), Cowan was identified by the Ontario Provincial Police and Thunder Bay Police as a primary source for hundreds of forged works attributed to the legendary Anishinaabe artist Norval Morrisseau.

While other rings in the operation (led by figures like Gary Lamont and David Voss) focused on mass-producing "paint-by-numbers" forgeries, Cowan's group specialized in the marketing and legitimization of these works. He allegedly provided false provenances and crafted elaborate backstories to convince galleries and private collectors that the paintings were authentic "lost" treasures.

Cowan's own personal lore was equally colorful; shortly before his 2023 arrest, he reportedly shared tales with local media about "lost treasure" buried by missionaries in Bolivia, claiming his return to South America was only delayed by the looming criminal charges.

According to evidence presented in court, Cowan worked in a tightly knit trio:

- Jeffery (Jeff) Cowan: The source and distributor who claimed many of the works came from his uncle, a claim that remained unsubstantiated.
- James (Jim) White: An elderly art dealer who acted as a major distributor, moving works from Cowan's hands into legitimate galleries and auction houses.
- Paul David Bremner: An appraiser who provided the "bogus certificates of authenticity" that gave the fakes their veneer of credibility.

Between 2016 and 2021 alone, records showed White made dozens of trips to Cowan's home, purchasing nearly 500 forged works for hundreds of thousands of dollars.

K v Cowan

When the case finally reached the Barrie courthouse in late 2025, Cowan chose to represent himself. He maintained a defiant stance, famously telling local reporters, "We are going to flip the script," and expressing total optimism for an acquittal.

His defense rested on two main pillars:

1. Systemic Uncertainty: He argued that Morrisseau's own history of substance abuse and inconsistent signature styles made it impossible to prove provenance for any mass collection of his work.
2. Scapegoating: He claimed the Crown had not met its burden of proof and that he was merely being used as a convenient target for the broader failures of the art market.

In November 2025, the jury rejected his arguments. After two days of deliberation, Jeff Cowan was found guilty on four counts:

- Three counts of fraud over $5,000
- One count of uttering a forged document

Two other fraud counts were withdrawn by the judge before reaching the jury. Unlike his co-accused (White and Bremner) who took plea deals resulting in house arrest, Cowan's decision to take the case to trial has left him facing the possibility of a significant prison term.

As of February 2026, Cowan's sentencing hearing is ongoing. In a final shift in strategy, he has set aside his self-representation and hired experienced appeal lawyers. His defense team is currently arguing that he was not a "ringleader" but perhaps merely "willfully blind," as they attempt to mitigate the upcoming sentence in a case that has irrevocably damaged the cultural legacy of the "Picasso of the North."

== Solo exhibitions ==
- 1961 Hughes Gallery, London, Ontario
- 1962, 1963, 1964 Pollock Gallery, Toronto
- 1965 Hart House Gallery at University of Toronto
- 1965 Galerie Godard Lefort, Montreal
- 1966 Musée du Québec (now renamed Musée National des Beaux-Arts du Québec), Quebec City
- 1966 Galerie Cartier (Co-sponsored by Pollock Gallery), Montreal
- 1968 Art Gallery of Newport (Sponsored by Galerie Cartier), Newport, Rhode Island
- 1969 Galerie St-Paul, St-Paul de Vence, France
- 1972 Pollock Gallery, Toronto
- 1974 Canadian Guild of Crafts, Toronto
- 1974 The Bau-Xi Gallery, Vancouver
- 1974 Pollock Gallery, Toronto
- 1975 Pollock Gallery, Toronto
- 1975 Shayne Gallery, Montreal
- 1976 Pollock Gallery, Toronto
- 1976 Gallery 115, Winnipeg
- 1977 Pollock Gallery, Toronto
- 1977 Graphic Gallery, Vancouver
- 1978 Wells Gallery, Ottawa
- 1978 First Canadian Place (sponsored by the Pollock Gallery), Toronto
- 1979 Pollock Gallery, Toronto
- 1979 The Gallery Stratford, Stratford, Ontario
- 1979 Shayne Gallery, Montreal
- 1979 The McMichael Canadian Collection (Artist in residence), Kleinburg, Ontario
- 1979 Cardigan/Milne Gallery, Winnipeg
- 1980 Canadian Galleries, Edmonton
- 1980 Lynnwood Arts Centre, Simcoe, Ontario
- 1980 Bayard Gallery, New York
- 1981 Pollock Gallery, Toronto
- 1981 Anthony's Gallery, Toronto
- 1981 Anthony's Gallery, Vancouver
- 1981 Thunder Bay National Exhibition Centre, Thunder Bay, Ontario
- 1981 Nexus Art Gallery, Toronto
- 1982 Moore Gallery, Hamilton, Ontario
- 1982 Masters Gallery, Calgary
- 1982 Robertson Gallery, Ottawa
- 1982 The New Man Gallery, London, Ontario
- 1982 Nexus Art Gallery, Toronto
- 1982 Legacy Art Gallery, Toronto
- 1982 Scarborough Public Gallery, Scarborough, Ontario
- 1984 Ontario Place, Toronto
- 1984 Ontario North Now, Kenora, Ontario
- 1985 Norman Mackenzie Art Gallery, Regina, Saskatchewan
- 1986 Manulife Centre, Edmonton
- 1987 Gulf Canada Gallery, Calgary
- 1988 Sinclair Centre, Vancouver
- 1989 The Art Emporium, Vancouver
- 1990 Kinsman Robinson Galleries, Toronto
- 1991 Kinsman Robinson Galleries, Toronto
- 1991 Wallack Gallery, Ottawa, Ontario
- 1992 Jenkins Showler Galleries, White Rock, British Columbia
- 1994 Kinsman Robinson Galleries, Toronto
- 1997 Kinsman Robinson Galleries, Toronto
- 1999 Kinsman Robinson Galleries, Toronto
- 1999 The Drawing Centre, New York
- 2001 Art Gallery of South Western Manitoba, Brandon, Manitoba
- 2001 Canada House Gallery, Banff, Alberta
- 2001 Drawing Center, New York
- 2002 Thunder Bay Art Gallery, Thunder Bay, Ontario
- 2006 Steffich Fine Art, Salt Spring Island, British Columbia
- 2006 National Gallery of Canada, Ottawa
- 2006 Thunder Bay Art Gallery, Thunder Bay, Ontario
- 2006 McMichael Canadian Art Collection, Kleinburg, Ontario
- 2006 Kinsman Robinson Galleries, Toronto
- 2007 Institute of American Indian Arts Museum, Santa Fe, New Mexico
- 2007 The George Gustav Heye Center of the National Museum of the American Indian, New York

== See also ==
- Indian Group of Seven
