= Beam =

Beam may refer to:

== Streams of particles or energy ==
- Light beam, or beam of light, a directional projection of light energy
  - Laser beam
- Radio beam
- Particle beam, a stream of charged or neutral particles
  - Charged particle beam, a spatially localized group of electrically charged particles
    - Cathode ray, or electron beam or e-beam, streams of electrons observed in discharge tubes
    - X-ray beam, a penetrating form of high-energy electromagnetic radiation
  - Molecular beam, a beam of particles moving at approximately equal velocities

== People ==
- Beam (rapper) (born 1995), American hip hop artist
- Alex Beam (born 1954), American writer and journalist
- Alex Beam (baseball) (1869–1938), American baseball player
- Alison Beam, American lawyer and lobbyist
- Ann Beam (1944–2024), Canadian artist
- Anong Beam, Canadian Ojibwe artist and curator
- C. Arlen Beam (1930–2025), American judge
- C. Richard Beam (1925–2018), American lexicographer
- Carl Beam (1943–2005), Indigenous Canadian artist
- Cris Beam, American writer
- Dawn H. Beam (born 1964), American judge
- Drew Beam (born 2003), American baseball player
- Ernie Beam (1867–1918), American baseball player
- Harry P. Beam (1892–1967), American politician
- Herman Beam (1929–1980), American racecar driver
- Jacob D. Beam (1908–1993), American diplomat
- James Beauregard Beam (1864–1947), American bourbon distiller
- Joe Beam, American sexologist and author
- John Beam (1959–2025), American football coach and athletics administrator
- Joline Beam, American politician
- Joseph Beam (1954–1988), African-American gay rights activist and writer
- Louis Beam (born 1946), American white supremacist
- Lura Beam (1887–1978), American educator, writer, and researcher
- Mike Beam, Kansas Secretary of Agriculture
- T. J. Beam (born 1980), American baseball player

== Arts, entertainment and media ==
- Beam (music), a connection line in musical notation
- Beam (single album), by Hoshi X Woozi, 2025
- The Beam (fairy tale), the Brothers Grimm tale 149
- BEAM.TV, an online digital delivery and content management platform
- BEAM Channel 31, a Philippines television network
- Beam (website), later Mixer, a former video game live streaming platform
- BeamNG.drive, an open-world vehicle simulation video game
- Beam, to transport matter using the Transporter in the Star Trek fictional universe

== Businesses ==
- Beam Software, later Krome Studios Melbourne, an Australian video game development studio
- Broadcast Enterprises and Affiliated Media, a telecommunications company in the Philippines
- Beam Energy, an energy provision arrangement of British company Robin Hood Energy

== Science and technology ==
- BEAM (Erlang virtual machine), a virtual machine at the core of the Erlang Open Telecom Platform
- BEAM robotics (biology, electronics, aesthetics and mechanics), a style of robotics
- Beam search, a heuristic search algorithm
- Bigelow Expandable Activity Module, an experimental expandable space station module
- Apache Beam, a data processing programming model
- Beam (structure), a structural element that resists lateral loads

== Other uses ==
- Beam (horse), a racehorse
- Beam (nautical), the width of a ship at its widest point
- Beam, Great Torrington, an estate in Devon, England
- Balance beam, or beam, a piece of gymnastics equipment
- The Beam (geological outcrop), in South Hero, Vermont, U.S.

== See also ==
- Battle of the Beams, a period in World War 2 of air radio navigation countermeasures
- Beam theory, or Euler–Bernoulli beam theory, a means of calculating load-carrying and deflection of structural beams
- Beam antenna, or directional antenna, an antenna which radiates or receives greater power in specific directions
- Bessel beam, a wave whose amplitude is described by a Bessel function
- Blaster beam, a musical instrument
- Gaussian beam, a beam of electromagnetic radiation whose amplitude is given by a Gaussian function
- Beme (disambiguation)
- "Light The Beam!", a rallying chant used by fans of the Sacramento Kings
