= Submerged forest =

Remains of trees beneath a body of water

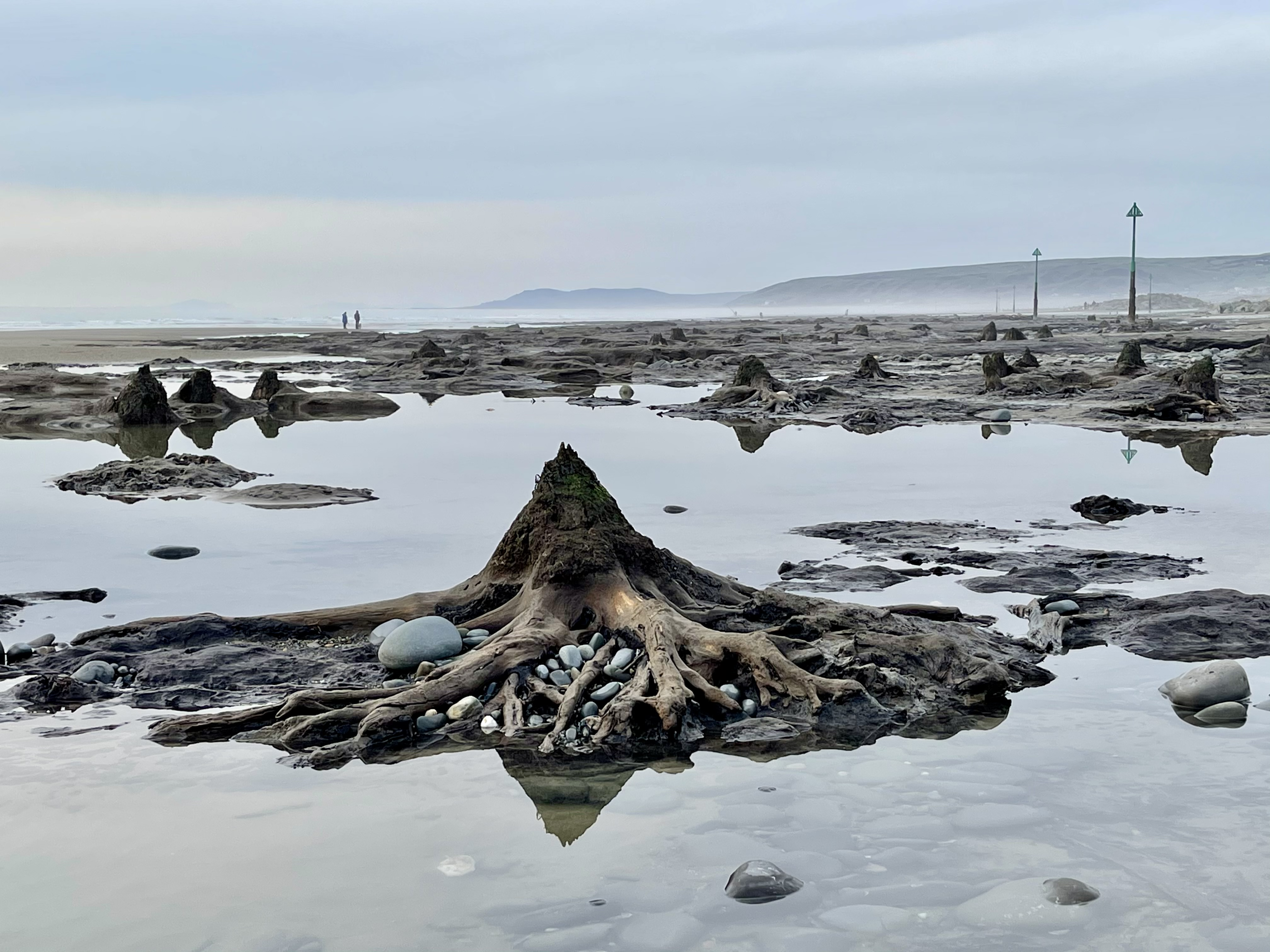
Submerged forest stumps at Borth, Wales

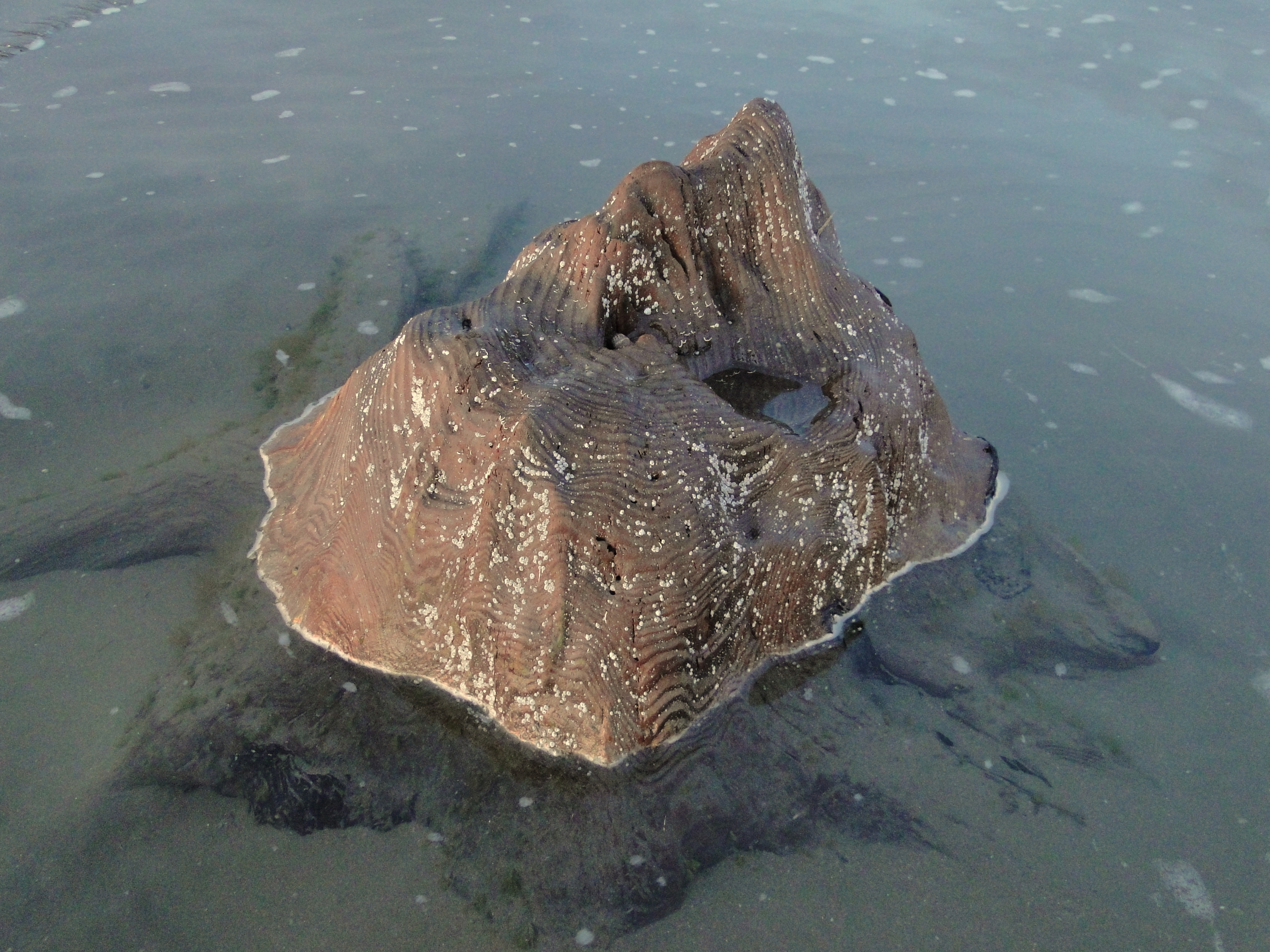
Tree stump at Ynyslas, Wales

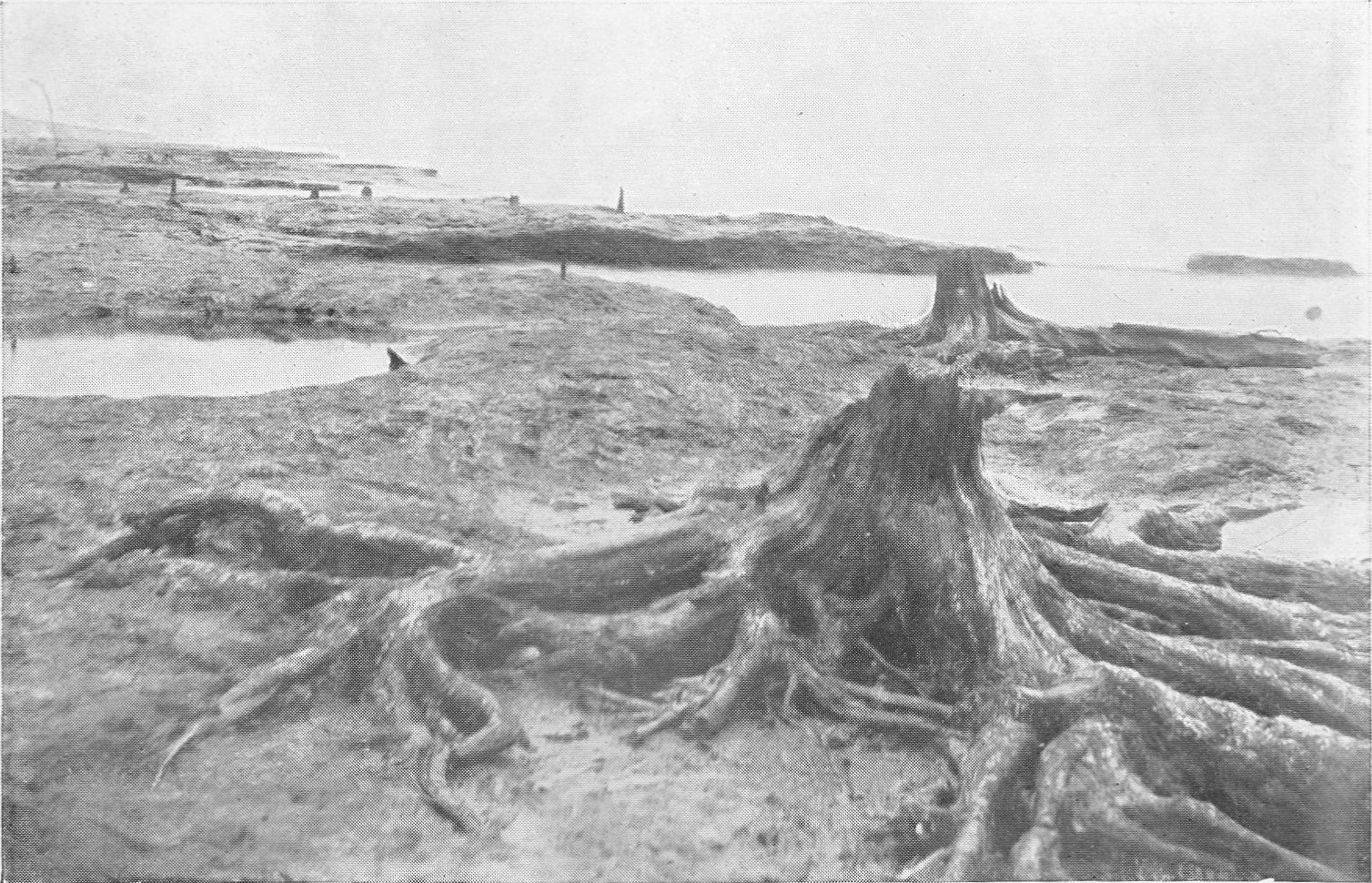
Submerged forest at Dove Point, on the Wirral Peninsula

A submerged forest is the in situ remains of trees, especially tree stumps, that lie submerged beneath a bay, sea, ocean, lake, or other body of water. These remains have usually been buried in mud, peat, or sand for several thousand years before being uncovered by sea level change and erosion and have been preserved in the compacted sediment by the exclusion of oxygen. A forest can become submerged as the result of a lake or sea level rise that results in a lacustrine or marine transgression and in-place drowning of the forest. A submerged forest that lies beneath a lake can also be formed by the blockage of a river valley by either a landslide or manmade dam.

== Examples ==
Marine submerged forests may be regularly exposed at low tide; examples of these can be found at low tide on the fringes of the submerged landmass known as Doggerland, around the coast of England and the coasts of Wales, the Channel Islands, north-west France and Denmark. One of the first recorded encounters with submerged forests was in 1892 off the coast of Mablethorpe. In some places, such as Blackpool Sands, Dartmouth, the remains are normally covered by sand and only rarely exposed. During the storms of 1974 (see Penparcau) and the winter storms of 2013–14 in the United Kingdom extensive remains of submerged forests were revealed in a number of places around the coast of Britain. For example, researchers discovered a 10,000 year old submerged forest that used to be part of Doggerland following the storm of 2013. There is also evidence that some submerged forests have disappeared over time as back in 1933, there were reports of a disappearing submerged forest off of the coast of Cheshire and Lancashire.

As the North American Laurentide Ice Sheet began receding for the last time some 10,000 years ago, water levels in the future Great Lakes were sometimes much lower than at present. Forests once covered the southern end of what is now Lake Huron but as the glaciers melted and waters rose these forests were inundated and drowned. Today their remnants, well preserved logs and stumps, have been discovered in waters over 60 m (200 ft) deep.

A submerged forest was found in Nantucket Sound, off the coast of Massachusetts. In 2012 a submerged bald cypress forest, which has been dated at around 60,000 years old, was discovered in the Gulf of Mexico off the coast of Alabama. There have been attempts to make it into a marine sanctuary.

== Ecosystem ==
Submerged forests host a whole variety of flora and fauna. The submerged forest located off of the coast of Alabama near Dauphin Island has the bald cypress tree (Taxodium distichum). Mantis shrimp, crabs, anemones, grouper, and red snappers are commonly found at this submerged forest, and of particular interest, due to their practical use in drug discovery, are shipworms.

== See also ==
- Fossil wood
- Polystrate fossil
- Petrified wood
