= CHYF-FM =

First Nations community radio station in M'Chigeeng First Nation, Ontario

Coordinates: 45.8268°N 82.1620°W

M'Chigeeng First Nation, Ontario; Canada
- Frequency: 88.9 MHz
- Branding: GIMA Radio

Programming
- Format: community radio

Ownership
- Owner: M'Chigeeng First Nation

History
- First air date: 2010

Technical information
- Class: LP
- ERP: 50 watts
- HAAT: 5 meters (16 ft)

Links
- Website: gimaaradio.ca

CHYF-FM is a radio station which broadcasts a First Nations community radio format on the frequency 88.9 FM in M'Chigeeng First Nation, Ontario, Canada.

Carrying on business as GIMA Radio (not for profit), the station received CRTC approval to use the 88.9 MHz frequency on June 17, 2010.

The station began testing with Industry Canada on August 23, 2010, and announced a celebration of inaugural broadcast in honor of Carl Beam on August 25, 2010, at the location of the stations host, Neon Raven Art Gallery, 53 Corbiere Rd, M'chigeeng, which was also the home and ancestral land of Carl Beam.

In 2015, Gimaa Radio relaunch fuels hopes for language renaissance.

On November 28, 2016, Gimaa Giigidoowin Communications (GGC) applied for authority to effect a change in the ownership and effective control of the English and aboriginal language Type B Native radio station CHYF-FM M'Chigeeng. The CRTC approved the application on March 21, 2017.
