= Beme =

Beme may refer to:

- Beme (company)
- Beme (app)
- Beme Seed, American psychedelic noise rock band
- Lake Beme, Cameroon
- SS Beme, a list of ships with this name

== See also ==
- Beam (disambiguation)
