= Anong Beam =

Ojibwe artist and curator

- Education: School of the Museum of Fine Arts, Boston; Ontario College of Art and Design
- Parent(s): Carl Beam, Ann Elena Weatherby
- Website: www.anongmigwansbeam.com

Anong Beam is an Ojibwe artist and curator from M'Chigeeng First Nation, Ontario.

== Early life and education ==
Born Anong Migwans Beam, Beam is the daughter of award winning Indigenous artist Carl Beam and feminist artist Ann Elena Weatherby.

In 1998, Beam attended the visual arts program School of the Museum of Fine Arts, Boston. This was followed by Beam attending the Ontario College of Art and Design from 1999–2000 and the Institute of American Indian Arts in 2001. Beam is currently a Masters student at York University.

== Career ==
Beam's artistic work is influenced by her sense of place and many of her paintings are connected to her home on Manitoulin Island.

In addition to her artistic work Beam has been actively involved in her local community and is well known for her curatorial work. In 2007, Beam was one of the founders of Gimaa Radio Communications, an English and Ojibwe language radio station in M'Chigeeng First Nation. The station is focused on Ojibwe language preservation and local Indigenous musical performances. From 2016–2017, Beam served as the Art Director of the Ojibwe Cultural Foundation. In 2017, she transitioned to become the Executive Director of the Ojibwe Cultural Foundation.

In 2017, Beam also launched her own line of watercolour and oil paints known as "BEAM Paints". The minerals and pigments for the paints are all locally sourced by Beam.

Beam has also been an outspoken advocate for the preservation of Indigenous archaeology and Indigenous ceramics within local communities.

In 2024, Anong authored the book Carl Beam: Life & Work, a monograph about her father's career published by the Art Canada Institute.

== Work ==
=== Solo exhibitions ===
- "New Works on Canvas" the Spoke Club, Toronto, ON (2018)
- "63 Views of Dreamers Rock", Beaverbrook Art Gallery,, Fredericton, NB (2016)
- "Submerged Landscapes", Station Gallery, Whitby, ON. (2016)
- "Reservoir" Latcham Gallery, Stouffvile, ON (2014)
- "Watershed", Art Gallery of Sudbury, Sudbury, ON (2012)
- "The Return Home", Gary Farmer Gallery of Contemporary Art, Santa Fe, NM (2007)
- "New Works", Ojibwe Cultural Foundation, M'Chigeeng, ON (2003)
- "Evolver", Gallery On Herald, Victoria, BC (2002)

=== Public collections ===
Beam's work is part of the following permanent collections:

- Archives of Ontario Queens Park Legislature
- Art Gallery of Peterborough
- Beaverbrook Art Gallery, New Brunswick
- Ford Foundation, New York, NY
- Art Gallery of Sudbury
- Art Gallery of Nova Scotia, Halifax, NS
- Museum of Contemporary Native Arts, Santa Fe, NM
- Ojibwe Cultural Foundation, M'Chigeeng, ON
- Canadian Clay and Glass Gallery, Waterloo, ON
- Royal Ontario Museum, Toronto, ON
