= The Beam (geological outcrop) =

The Beam is a geological outcrop on US Route 2 in South Hero, Vermont that is well known for its display of small-scale thrust faults originating from the Taconic Orogeny. The Beam is frequently visited by geology students studying the geology of New England.

== Geology ==
The Beam is found in the Cumberland Head Formation and is composed of two beds of calcareous shale, divided by a bed of micrite. The micrite bed displays rigid body displacement with roof thrusts and ramp thrusts along the length of the exposed bed. The shale displays pressure dissolution with steeply dipping cleavage, abundant calcite veins, and slickenlines. Both beds were subjected to east–west compression and as a result of their differing mineralogy, they shortened in different ways. Many lecturers who visit this site use the outcrop as a small scale example of the large scale tectonics active in the Vermont region.
