= Ann Beam =

American multimedia artist

- Born: 1944; Brooklyn, New York
- Died: April 25, 2024 (aged 80)
- Occupation: Artist
- Spouse: Carl Beam
- Children: Anong Beam

Ann Beam (1944 – April 25, 2024) was a multimedia artist based in M'Chigeeng First Nation, Manitoulin Island. Born Ann Elena Weatherby in 1944 in Brooklyn, New York, she was the spouse of artist Carl Beam. She has a BFA from State University of New York at Buffalo. She taught at the Art Gallery of Ontario in the late 1960s and 1970s and later managed the Neon Raven Art Gallery on Manitoulin Island. Themes covered in her art have been described as "cultural histories of women's labour in building homes, in motherhood, cooking and teaching." She has worked with various mediums, including oil and acrylic, found art, recycled materials, pottery, paper and cloth.

== Public collections ==
- Tom Thomson Art Gallery, Owen Sound, Ontario
- Royal Ontario Museum, Toronto, Ontario
- Justina M Barnicke Gallery, Hart House, University of Toronto
- Gardiner Museum of Ceramic Art, Toronto, Ontario
- Art Gallery of Peterborough, Peterborough, Ontario
- Canadian Clay and Glass Gallery, Waterloo, Ontario
- Canada Council Art Bank, Ottawa, Ontario
- Carleton University Art Gallery, Ottawa, Ontario
- MacLaren Art Centre, Barrie, Ontario
- Simon Fraser University, British Columbia
- Art Gallery of Algoma, Sault Ste. Marie, Ontario
- College Boreal, Sudbury Ontario
- University of Toronto, Thomas Fisher Rare Book Library
- Art Gallery of Nova Scotia

== Exhibitions ==
- 2014 Continuously Arriving Moment, Gallery Stratford, Stratford Ontario. July 5-October
- 2014 Express Wagon, La Galerie Nouvel Ontario, Sudbury, Ontario. Jan. 24-March 1, 2014. Solo Exhibition
- 2013 The Engine Room, Tom Thomson Art Gallery, Owen Sound, Ontario. Solo Exhibition
- 2012 New Vision=New World, Neon Raven Art Gallery, Solo Show M'chigeeng, Ontario. July 1- August 30, 2012
- 2011 Waterfall, Solo Exhibition, Neon Raven Art Gallery, M'chigeeng, Ontario. July 9 - Sept. 15, 2011
- 2010 Cross Pollination 2, Gore Bay Museum, Gore Bay, Ontario. Group Show, October 14, 2010
- 2009 No Drips Allowed, Jonathon Bancroft Snell Gallery, London, Ontario. January - March 2009
- 2008 Earth and Shell, Solo Exhibition, Gore Bay Museum, Gore Bay, Ontario. Aug.16-Oct.14, 2008
- 2008 Beyond Space and Time, Durham Art Gallery, Durham, Ontario. Two Person Show
- 2007 On The Table; 100 Years of Functional Ceramics in Canada, Gardiner Museum, Toronto, Ontario. Jan.15 - April 30, 2007, Winnipeg Art Gallery, and Art Gallery of Nova Scotia. Group Show
- 2006 Picturing Her: Images of Girlhood, McCord Museum, Montreal, Quebec, Dec. 1, 2005-April 6, 2006, Group Show
- 2005 Corona-Dialogues with Earth Mother, Solo Show Sheguiandah, Centennial Museum, Sheguiandah, Ontario
- 2004 It's All Relative, Touring Exhibition, Three Person Show with Carl Beam and Anong Beam. Canadian Clay Glass Museum, Waterloo, Ontario.; Algoma Art Gallery, Sault Ste. Marie, Ontario.; Thunder Bay Art Gallery, Thunder Bay, Ontario.; April 15-May 22, 2005, Art Gallery of Peterborough, Ontario
- 2003 Motherlines, Solo Exhibition, Carleton University Art Gallery, Ottawa, Ontario. January 13 - February 23, 2003
- 2003 All Things Are Connected, Residency at the Gardiner Museum of Ceramic Art, Toronto, Ontario
- 2002 Shamans and Ravens, Ann Beam, Two Person Show, DeLeon White Gallery, Toronto, Ontario. Mar 31 - July 13
- 2001 Steel City Gallery, Hamilton, Ontario. with Novak Graphics. Dec 1,- June 15, 2002, Group Show
- 2000 Novak Graphics Print Show, Liu Haisu Museum, Shanghai, China, October, Group Show
- 2001 Novak Graphics, Xien- Shen, China, January 2001
- 2000 Studies in the Motherline, Solo Exhibition, V. Mcdonnell Gallery, Toronto, Ontario. January 8- February 15
- 2000 Subdivision Suite/Earth Builder's Narrative, Solo Exhibition, Struts Gallery, Sackville, NB October 12- Nov. 4, 2000
- 1996 Nellie and Mary and Related Works, Solo Exhibition, La Parete Gallery, Toronto, Ontario. Sept.22 - Oct.8
- 1992 East of the Diamond Lightning, Solo Exhibition, Art Gallery of Peterborough, Peterborough, Ontario
- 1992 Works by Ann and Carl Beam, Ufundi Gallery, Ottawa, Ontario
- 1992 A Response, Group Show, Art Space, Peterborough, Ontario
- 1986 Constellation of Solitaire, Solo Exhibition, Brignall Gallery, 80 Spadina Ave. Toronto, Ontario
- 1983 Indians and Angels, Ann Beam, Laurentian University Museum and Art Centre, Sudbury, Ontario
- 1982 The Painted Pottery of Ann and Carl Beam, Maxwell Museum, The University of New Mexico, Albuquerque
- 1977 Prints From Open Studio, Group Show, McDonald Block, Queen's Park, Toronto, Ontario
- 1977 O.S. Prints, Group Show, Glenbow Museum, Calgary Alberta
- 1976 The Chair Show, Group Show, Art Gallery of Ontario, Toronto, Ontario
