= Polystrate fossil =

Creationist term for a fossil that extends through more than one geological stratum

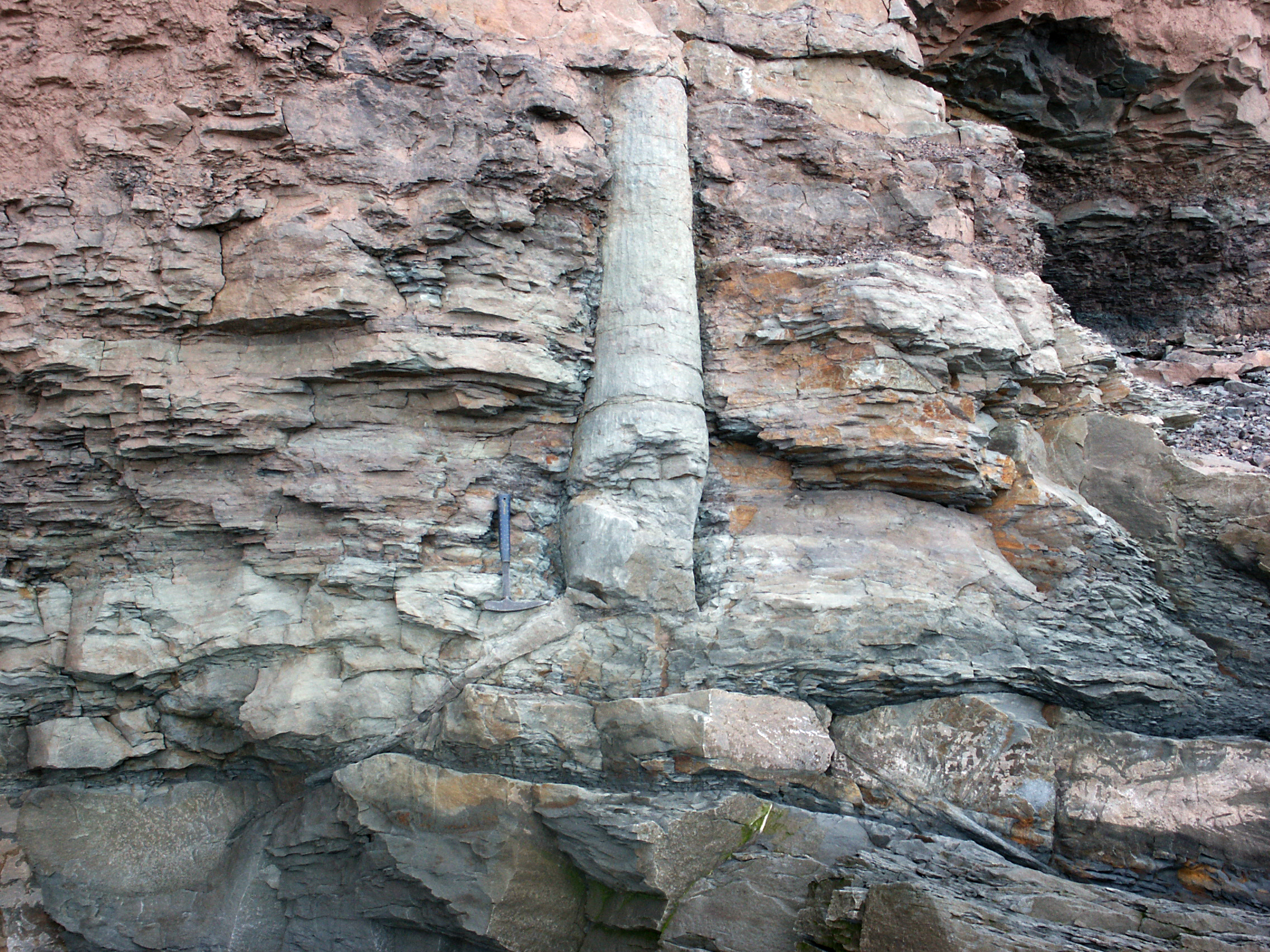
Ancient in situ lycopsid, probably Sigillaria, with attached stigmarian roots. Specimen is from the Joggins Formation (Pennsylvanian), Cumberland Basin, Nova Scotia.

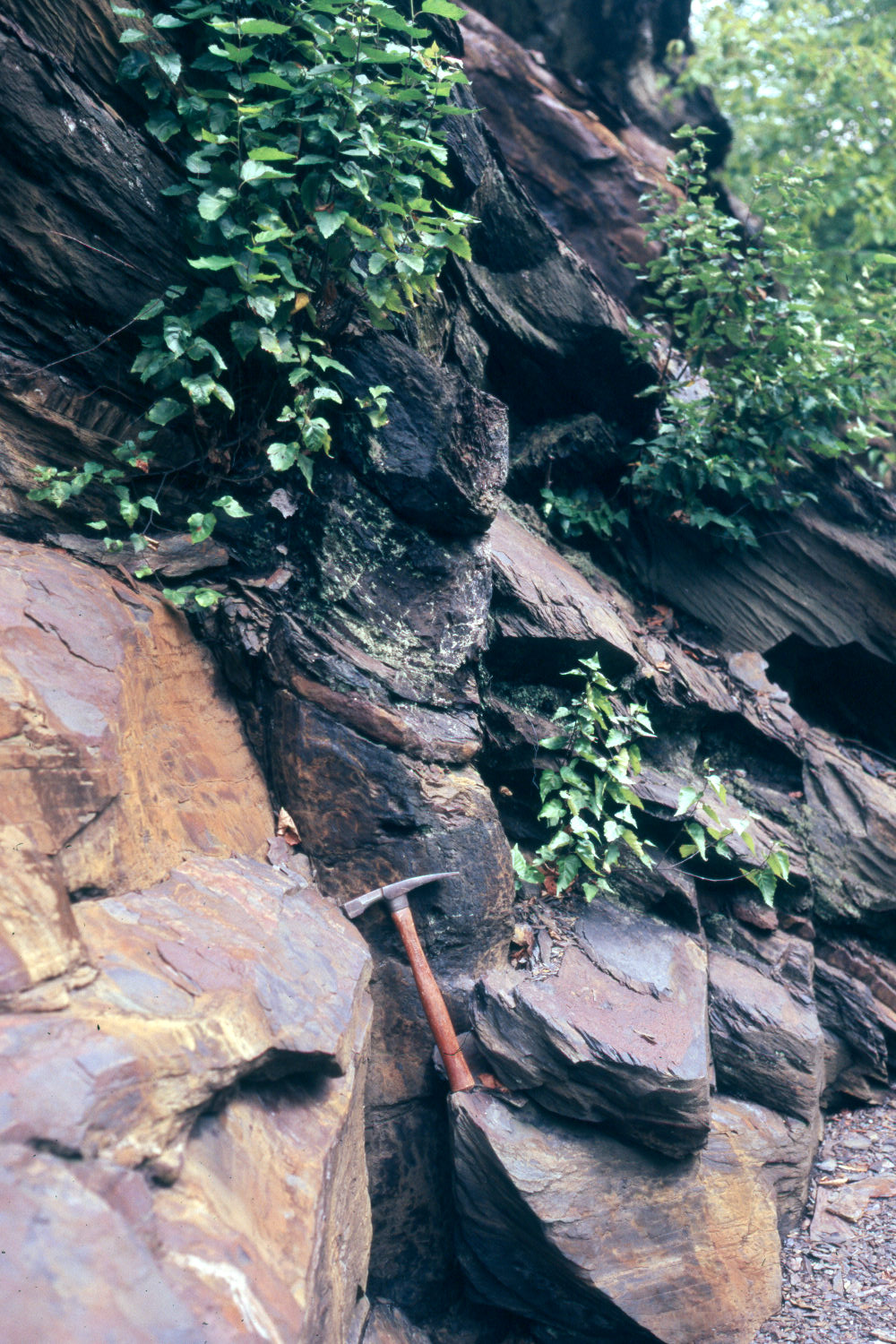
Upright Sigillaria in dipping beds of Pennsylvanian Llewellyn Formation in Bear Valley Strip Mine, Northumberland County, Pennsylvania

A polystrate fossil is a fossil of a single organism (such as a tree trunk) that extends through more than one geological stratum. The word polystrate is not a standard geological term. This term is typically found in creationist publications.

This term is typically applied to "fossil forests" of upright fossil tree trunks and stumps that have been found worldwide, i.e. in the Eastern United States, Eastern Canada, England, France, Germany, and Australia, typically associated with coal-bearing strata. Within Carboniferous coal-bearing strata, it is also very common to find what are called Stigmaria (root stocks) within the same stratum. Stigmaria are completely absent in post-Carboniferous strata, which contain either coal, polystrate trees, or both.

== Geological explanation ==
In geology, such fossils are referred to as either upright fossil trunks, upright fossil trees, or T0 assemblages. According to mainstream models of sedimentary environments, they are formed by rare to infrequent brief episodes of rapid sedimentation separated by long periods of either slow deposition, nondeposition, or a combination of both.

Upright fossils typically occur in layers associated with an actively subsiding coastal plain or rift basin, or with the accumulation of volcanic material around a periodically erupting stratovolcano. Typically, this period of rapid sedimentation was followed by a period of time - decades to thousands of years long - characterized by very slow or no accumulation of sediments. In river deltas and other coastal-plain settings, rapid sedimentation is often the end result of a brief period of accelerated subsidence of an area of coastal plain relative to sea level caused by salt tectonics, global sea-level rise, growth faulting, continental margin collapse, or some combination of these factors. For example, geologists such as John W. F. Waldron and Michael C. Rygel have argued that the rapid burial and preservation of polystrate fossil trees found at Joggins, Nova Scotia directly result from rapid subsidence, caused by salt tectonics within an already subsiding pull-apart basin, and from the resulting rapid accumulation of sediments. The specific layers containing polystrate fossils occupy only a very limited fraction of the total area of any of these basins.

=== Yellowstone ===
The upright fossil trees of the Gallatin Petrified Forest in the Gallatin Range and the Yellowstone Petrified Forest at Amethyst Mountain and Specimen Ridge in Yellowstone National Park, occur buried within the lahars and other volcanic deposits comprising the Eocene Lamar River Formation as the result of periods of rapid sedimentation associated with explosive volcanism. This type of volcanism generates and deposits large quantities of loose volcanic material as a blanket over the slope of a volcano, as happened during the 1991 eruption of Mount Pinatubo. Both during and for years after a period of volcanism, lahars and normal stream activity wash this loose volcanic material downslope. These processes result in the rapid burial of large areas of the surrounding countryside beneath several meters of sediment, as directly observed during the 1991 eruption of Mount Pinatubo. As with modern lahar deposits, the sedimentary layers containing upright trees of the Yellowstone petrified forest are discontinuous and very limited in areal extent. Individual layers containing upright trees and individual buried forests occupy only a very small fraction of the total area of Yellowstone National Park.

=== Fossil soils ===
Geologists have recognized innumerable fossil soils (paleosols) throughout the strata containing upright fossils at Joggins in Nova Scotia, in the Yellowstone petrified forests, in the coal mines of the Black Warrior Basin of Alabama, and at many other locations. The layer immediately underlying coal seams, often called either "seatearth" or "underclay", typically either consists of or contains a paleosol. Paleosols are soils which were formed by subaerial weathering during periods of very slow or no accumulation of sediments. Later, renewed sedimentation buried these soils to create paleosols. These paleosols are identified on the basis of the presence of structures and microstructures unique to soils; animal burrows and molds of plant roots of various sizes and types; recognizable soil-profile development; and alteration of minerals by soil processes. In many cases, these paleosols are virtually identical to modern soils.

Geologists, who have studied upright fossils found in sedimentary rocks exposed in various outcrops for decades, have described the upright fossil trees as being deeply rooted in place and typically rooted in recognizable paleosols. Researchers such as Falcon and Rygel et al., have published detailed field-sketches and pictures of upright tree-fossils with intact root systems, which are rooted within recognizable paleosols. In the case of the upright fossil trees of the Yellowstone petrified forests, it has been found that the upright fossil trees, except for relatively short stumps, are rooted in place within the underlying sediments. Typically, the sediments within which trees are rooted have paleosols developed within them. Retallack (1981, 1997) has published pictures and diagrams of the Yellowstone upright fossil trees having intact root systems developed within paleosols found within these strata.

=== Formation by regeneration ===
Geologists have also found that some of the larger upright fossil trees found within Carboniferous coal-bearing strata show evidence of regeneration after being partially buried by sediments. In these cases, the trees were clearly alive when they were partially buried by sediments. The accumulated sediment was insufficient to kill the trees immediately because of their size. As a result, some of them developed a new set of roots from their trunks just below the new ground surface. Until they either died or were overwhelmed by the accumulating sediments, these trees would likely continue to regenerate by adding height and new roots with each increment of sediment, eventually leaving several meters of former "trunk" buried underground as sediments accumulated.

=== Formation by Carboniferous deglacial meltwater-pulses ===
In addition, part of the Carboniferous Period was a period of extensive and thick continental ice sheets. During the Carboniferous ice age, the repeated glacial – interglacial cycles caused major changes in the thickness and extent of continental ice sheets. When these ice sheets expanded in extent and thickness, eustatic sea level typically fell by over 100 meters (330 ft). When these ice sheets shrank in extent and thickness, eustatic sea level typically rose again by typically over 100 meters (330 ft). As occurred during the Holocene Epoch for Meltwater pulse 1A and Meltwater pulse 1B, brief episodes of rapid melting of Carboniferous, Gondwanan continental ice sheets likely caused very rapid rises in sea level that would have abruptly inundated low-lying coastal swamps and drowned the forests growing on them. Based on the sedimentology of roof strata of surface and underground coal mines and cyclothems containing the fossils of upright and in situ tree trunks, geologists proposed that the flooding of coastal swamp by deglacial meltwater pulses resulted in the rapid flooding of coastal forests, particularly along preexisting coastal rivers and streams, over large areas of coastal swamp. During and after their submergence, upright trunks of drowned coastal forests were buried by tidally influenced sedimentation.

=== Association with marine fossils ===
Geologists find nothing anomalous about upright fossil trees found in Carboniferous coal-bearing strata being associated with marine or brackish-water fossils. Because they lived on subsiding coastal plains or pull-apart basins open to the coast, it was quite frequent for subsidence to periodically outpace the accumulation of sediments such that adjacent shallow marine waters would periodically inundate coastal plains in which the trees were buried. As a result, sediments containing marine fossils would periodically accumulate within these areas before being replaced by coastal swamps - either as sediments filled in the shallow sea or as the sea level fell. Also, according to ecological reconstructions by geologists, specific assemblages of the types of trees found as upright fossils occupied brackish water, even saline coastal swamps much like modern mangrove swamps. Thus, finding marine and brackish water fossils associated with these trees is no different than finding brackish water or marine animals living in modern mangrove swamps.

A detailed study by Taylor and Vinn (2006) of the microstructure of fossils which have been traditionally identified as "Spirorbis" in the geological literature revealed that they consist of the remains of at least two completely different animals. Taylor and Vinn discovered that the "Spirorbis" fossils found in sedimentary strata, including the Joggins and other Carboniferous coal measures deposited from the Ordovician to Triassic periods are the remains of an extinct order of lophophorates (now called microconchids) unrelated to modern marine tube-worms (Annelids) to which the genus Spirorbis belongs. This contradicts arguments made by Harold Coffin and other creationists that "Spirorbis" fossils within strata containing polystrate fossils indicate their deposition in a marine environment, because these fossils are classified as the remains of extinct fresh and brackish water microconchids instead of the remains of the marine genera Spirorbis as they have been misidentified in the geologic literature.

=== Quaternary examples ===
Scientists interpret polystrate fossils as fossils buried in a geologically short time span - either by one large depositional event or by several smaller ones. Geologists see no need to invoke a global flood to explain upright fossils. This position of geologists is supported by numerous documented examples, a few of which are discussed in the paragraphs below, of buried upright tree-trunks that have been observed buried in the Holocene volcanic deposits of Mount St. Helens, Skamania County, Washington, and Mount Pinatubo, Philippines; in the deltaic and fluvial sediments of the Mississippi River Delta; and in glacial deposits within the midwestern United States. These buried upright trees demonstrate that conventional geologic processes are capable of burying and preserving trees in an upright position such that in time, they will become fossilized.

==== Volcanic deposits ====
At this time, the best documented occurrences of unfossilized buried upright trees occur within the historic and late-Holocene volcanic deposits of Mount St. Helens (Skamania County, Washington) and of Mount Pinatubo in the Philippines. At Mount St. Helens, both unfossilized and partially fossilized trees have occurred in many outcrops of volcanic debris and mud flows (lahars) and pyroclastic flow deposits, which date from 1885 to over 30,000 BP., along the South Toutle and other rivers. Late Holocene forests of upright trees also occur within the volcanic deposits of other Cascade Range volcanoes. In the space of a few years after the eruption of Mount Pinatubo in 1991, the erosion of loose pyroclastic deposits covering the slopes of the mountain generated a series of volcanic lahars, which ultimately buried large parts of the countryside along major streams draining these slopes beneath several meters of volcanic sediments. The repeated deposition of sediments by volcanic lahars and by sediment-filled rivers not only created innumerable polystrate trees, but also "polystrate" telephone-poles, churches, and houses, over a period a few years. The volcanic deposits enclosing modern upright trees are often virtually identical in their sedimentary structures, external and internal layering, texture, buried soils, and other general character to the volcanic deposits containing the Yellowstone buried forests. As in case of modern forests buried by lahars, the individual buried forests of the Yellowstone Petrified Forest and the layers containing them are very limited in their areal extent.

==== Deltaic deposits ====
Within excavations for Interstate Highway 10 in the United States of America, and in borrow pits, in landfills, and archaeological surveys, unfossilized upright trees have been found buried within late Holocene, even historic, fluvial and deltaic sediments underlying the surface of the Mississippi River Delta and the Atchafalaya Basin of Louisiana. In one case, borrow pits dug in the natural levees of Bayou Teche near Patterson, Louisiana, have exposed completely buried, 4 to 6 feet (1.2 to 1.8 meters) high, upright trunks of cypress trees. Northeast of Donaldsonville, Louisiana, a borrow pit excavated for fill used to maintain nearby artificial levees, exposed three levels of rooted upright tree trunks stacked on top of each other lying completely buried beneath the surface of Point Houmas, a patch of floodplain lying within a meander loop of the current course of the Mississippi River. While searching for buried archaeological sites, archaeologists excavated a 12 ft (3.6 meter) high upright rooted cypress tree completely buried within a natural levee of the Atchafalaya River within the Indian Bayou Wildlife Management Area just south of Krotz Springs, Louisiana. Radiocarbon dates and historic documents collected for this archaeological survey, during which this and other upright trees were found, of the Indian Bayou Wildlife Management Area demonstrated that these upright trees were buried in the 1800s, during the initial diversion of Mississippi River's flow into the Atchafalaya River.

==== Glacial deposits ====
Unfossilized, late Pleistocene upright trees have been found buried beneath glacial deposits within North America along the southern edge of the Laurentide Ice Sheet. These buried forests were created when the southern edge of the Laurentide Ice Sheet locally dammed valleys. As a result, meltwater lakes filled these valleys and submerged forests within them. Sediments released by the melting of the adjacent ice sheet rapidly filled these lakes, which quickly buried and preserved the submerged forests lying within them. One forest of in situ, 24,000-year-old unfossilized upright trees was exposed by excavations for a quarry near Charleston, Illinois. Excavations for a tailings pond about Marquette, Michigan, exposed an in situ forest of unfossilized trees, which are about 10,000 years old, buried in glacial lake and stream sediments.
