= Bear Valley Strip Mine =

Mine in Pennsylvania, United States

Coordinates: 40°45.8′N 76°35.7′W

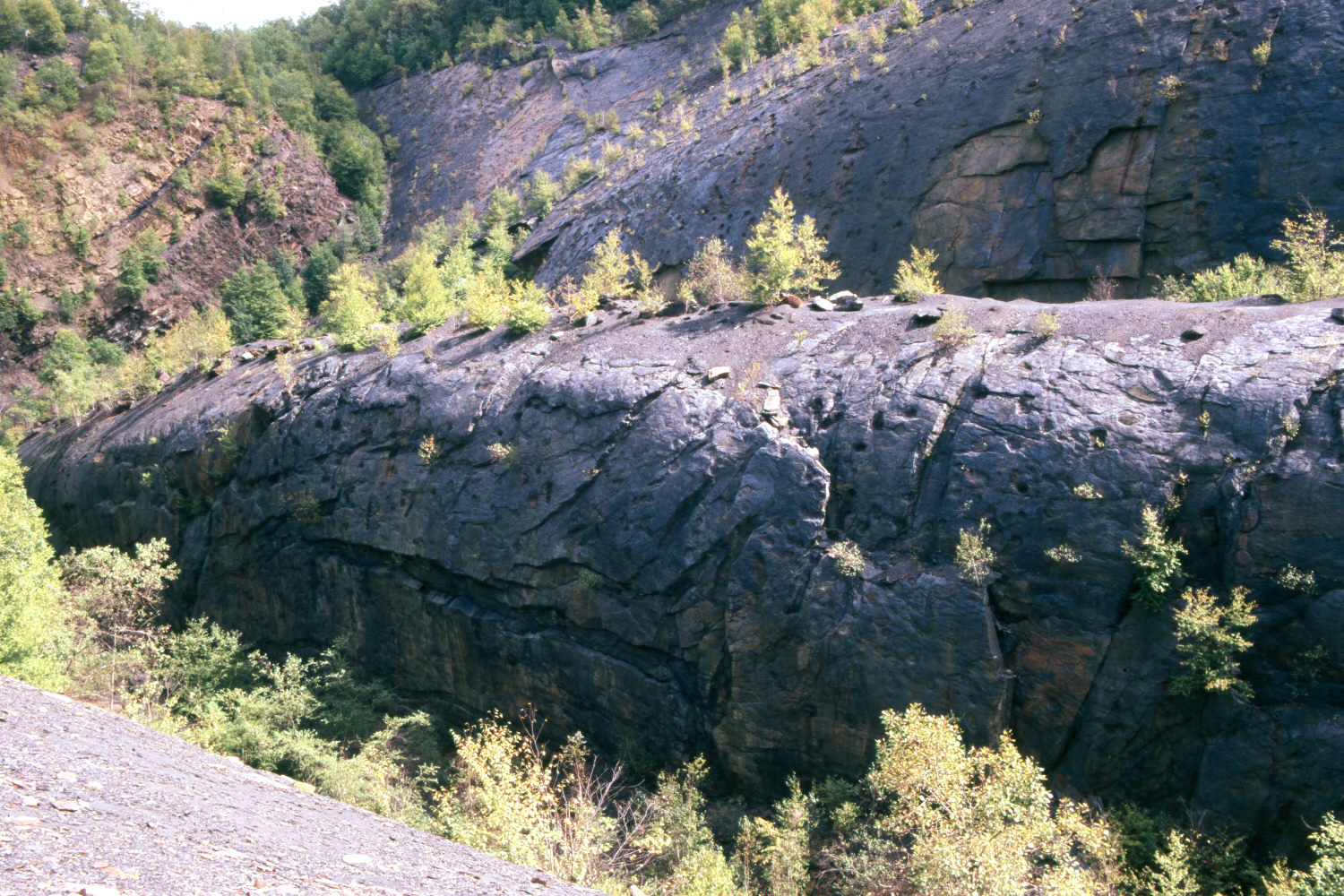
View of the Bear Valley Strip Mine from the north wall facing southeast, with the "Whaleback" in center

The Bear Valley Strip Mine is an abandoned coal strip mine located in Coal Township, Northumberland County, to the southwest of the town of Shamokin, Pennsylvania. It lies in the Western Middle Field of the Anthracite belt in the Ridge-and-Valley Appalachians, where the Pennsylvanian Llewellyn Formation is exposed. The property is owned by the Reading Anthracite Company.

== Structural geology ==
The coal and other overlying rock has been removed by mining down to a resistant sandstone bed, revealing the three-dimensional structures of folding and faulting caused by the Alleghany Orogeny. Students of geology have visited the location for decades due to the quality of exposures.

The central anticline in the valley is often called the "Whaleback".

The sequence of structural deformation is outlined as follows:

Stage	Deformation event
I	Joint formation in coal
II	Joint formation with quartz fiber fillings in sandstone and ironstone
III	Pressure solution and primary crenulation cleavage
IV	Conjugate wrench and wedge faults form
V	Large-scale folding
VI	Extensional jointing and faulting

== Gallery ==
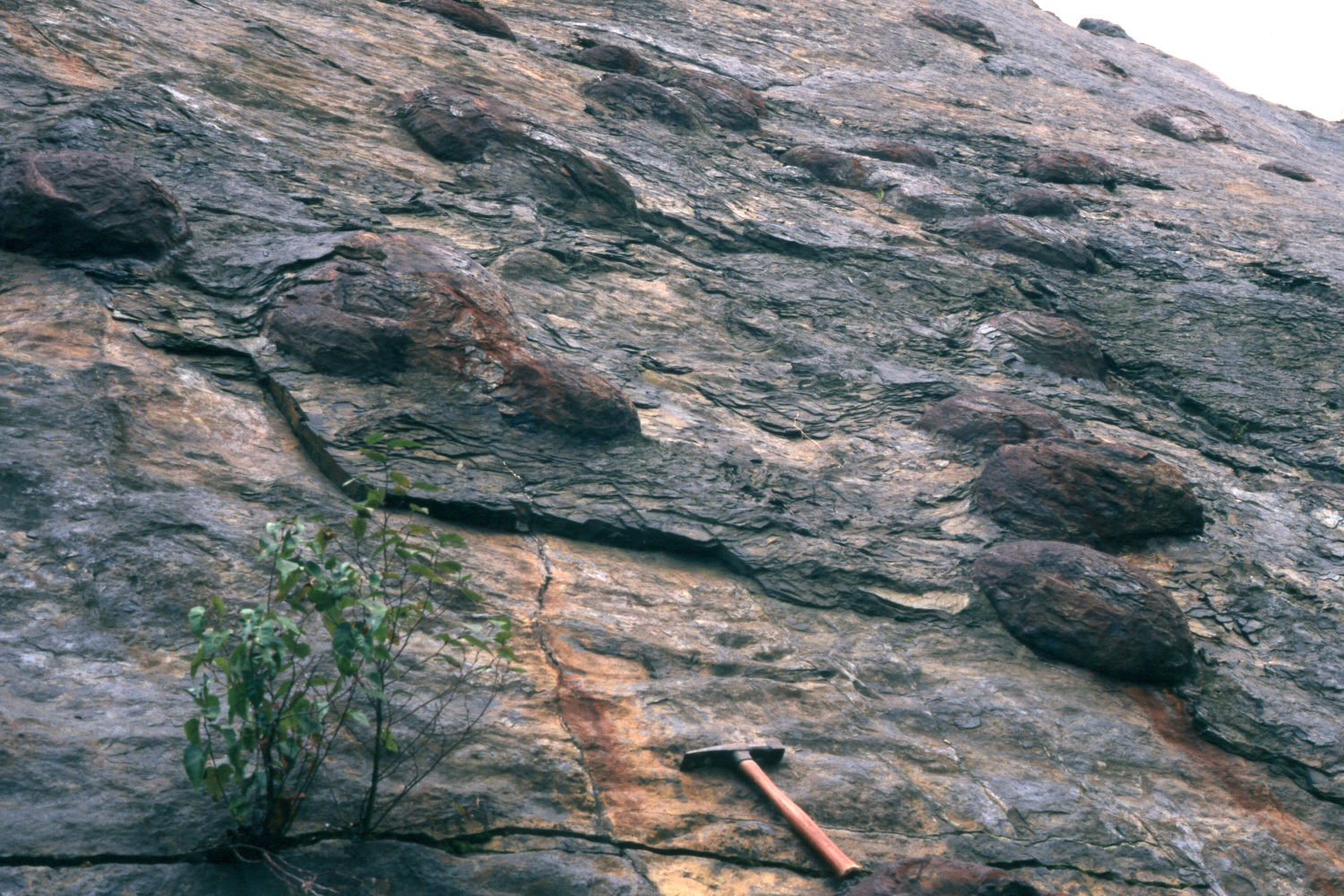
Concretions in the south wall

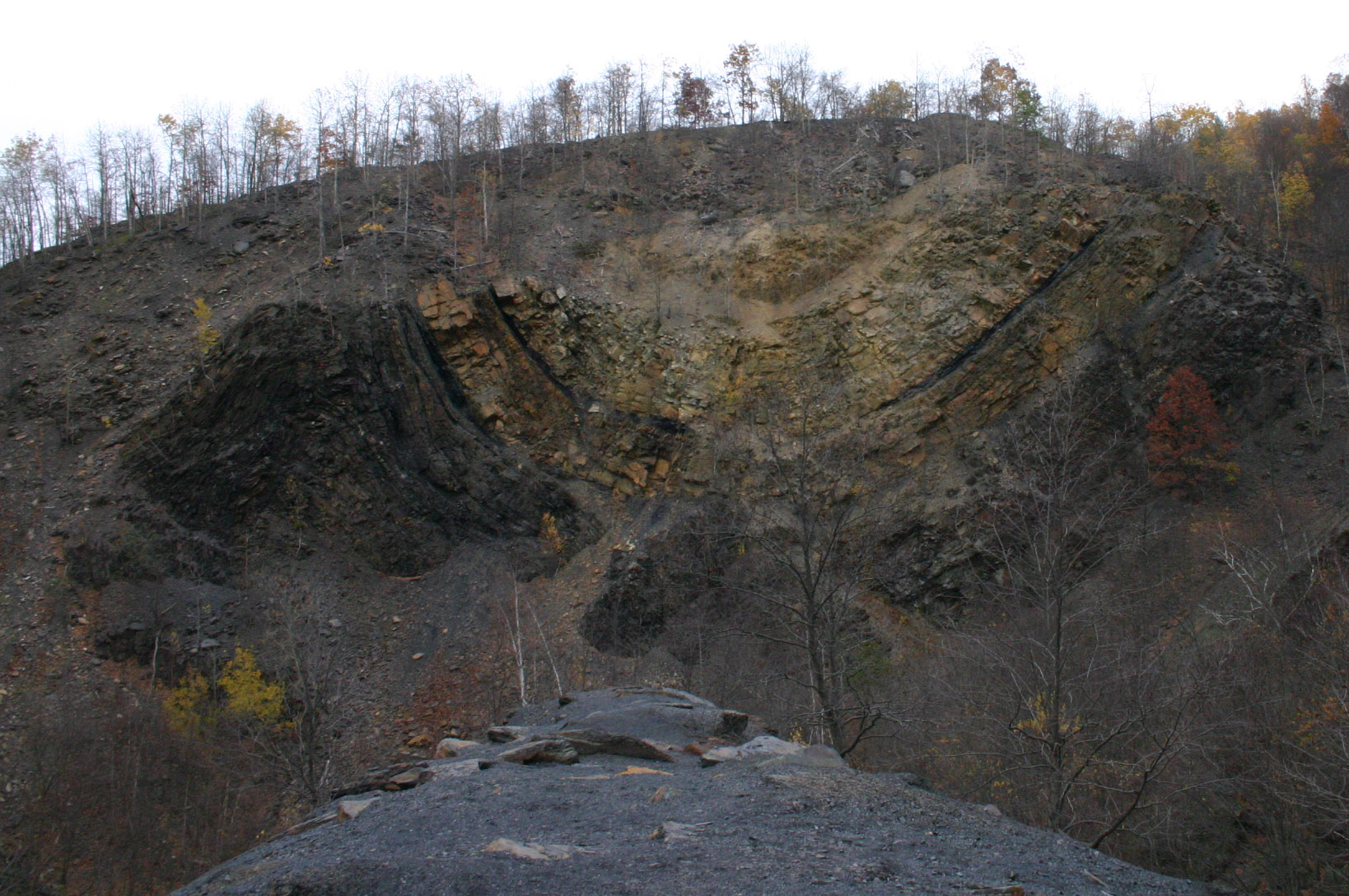
View of the east wall from the Whaleback

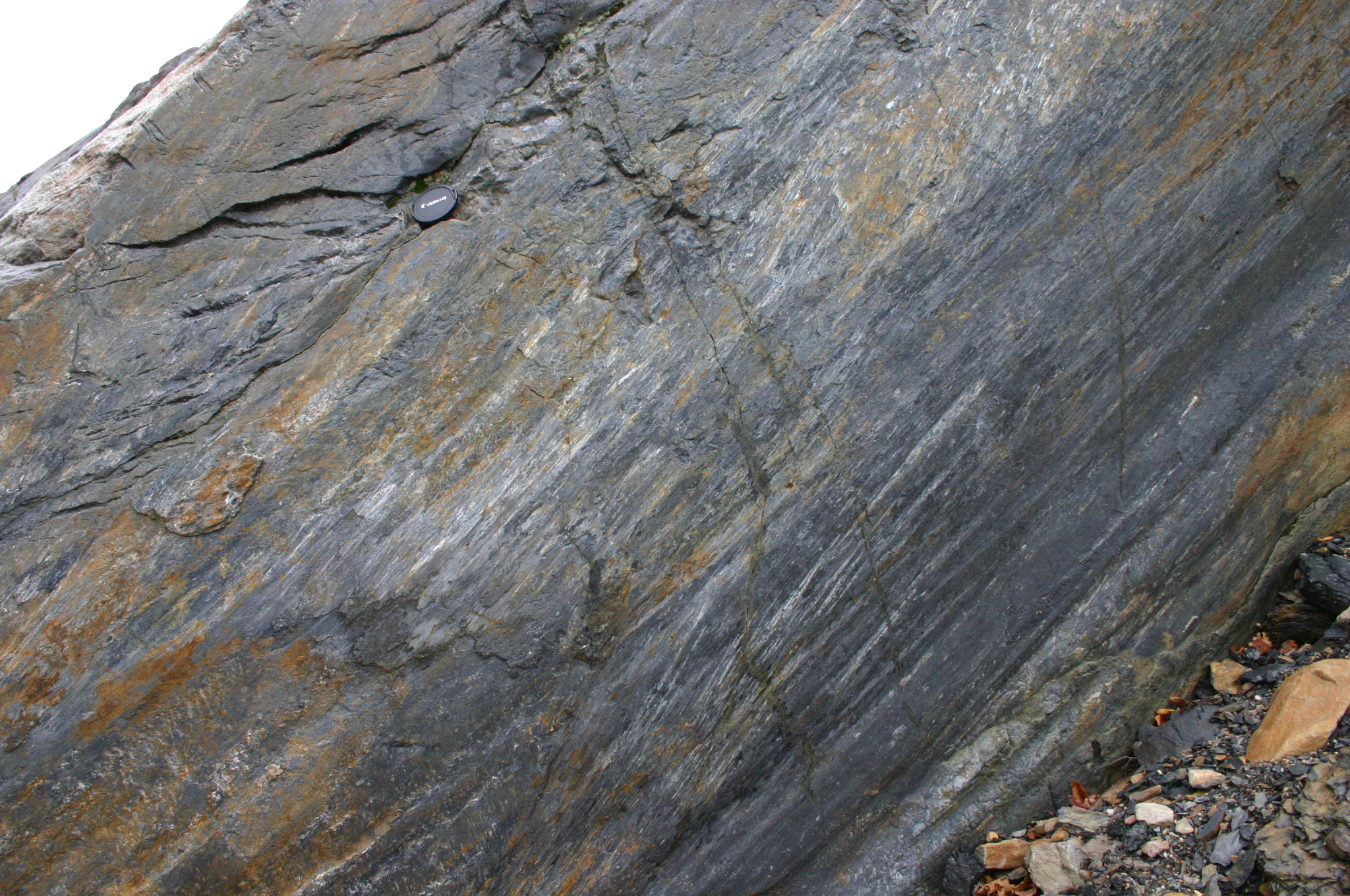
Slickensides on a fault plane, south wall. Lens cap 5.8 cm wide.

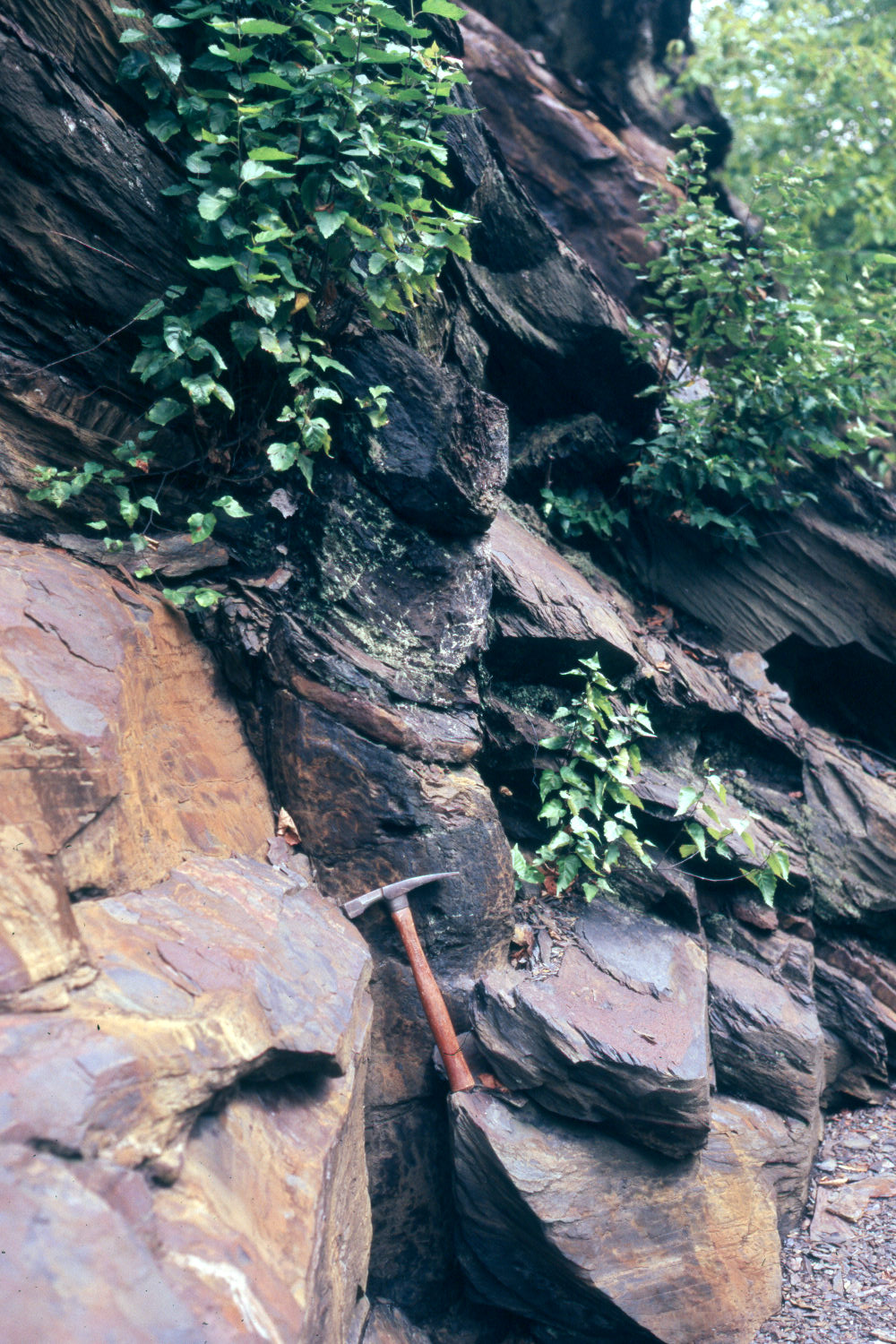
Upright Sigillaria in dipping sandstone and shale beds of the north wall. A so-called "Polystrate fossil".

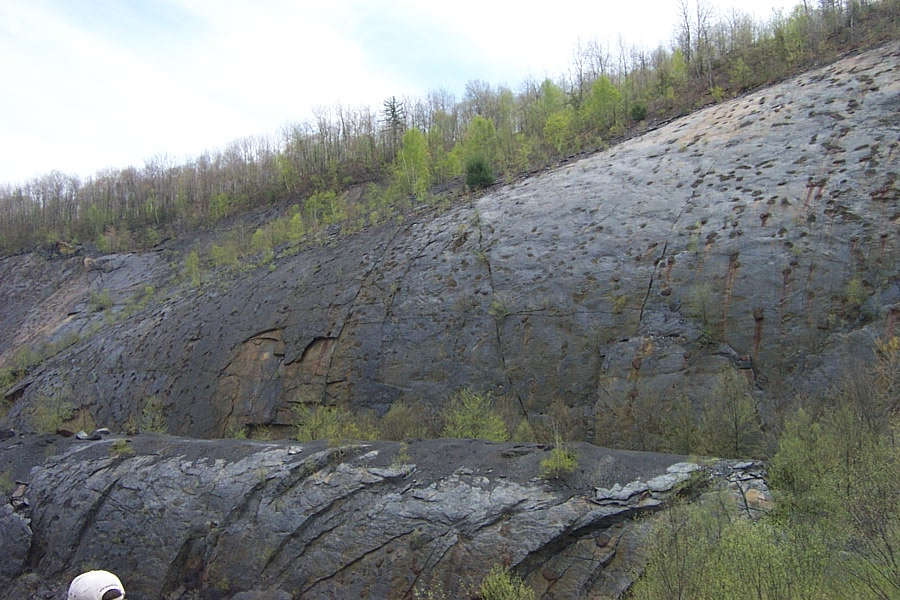
Another image of the south wall and Whaleback

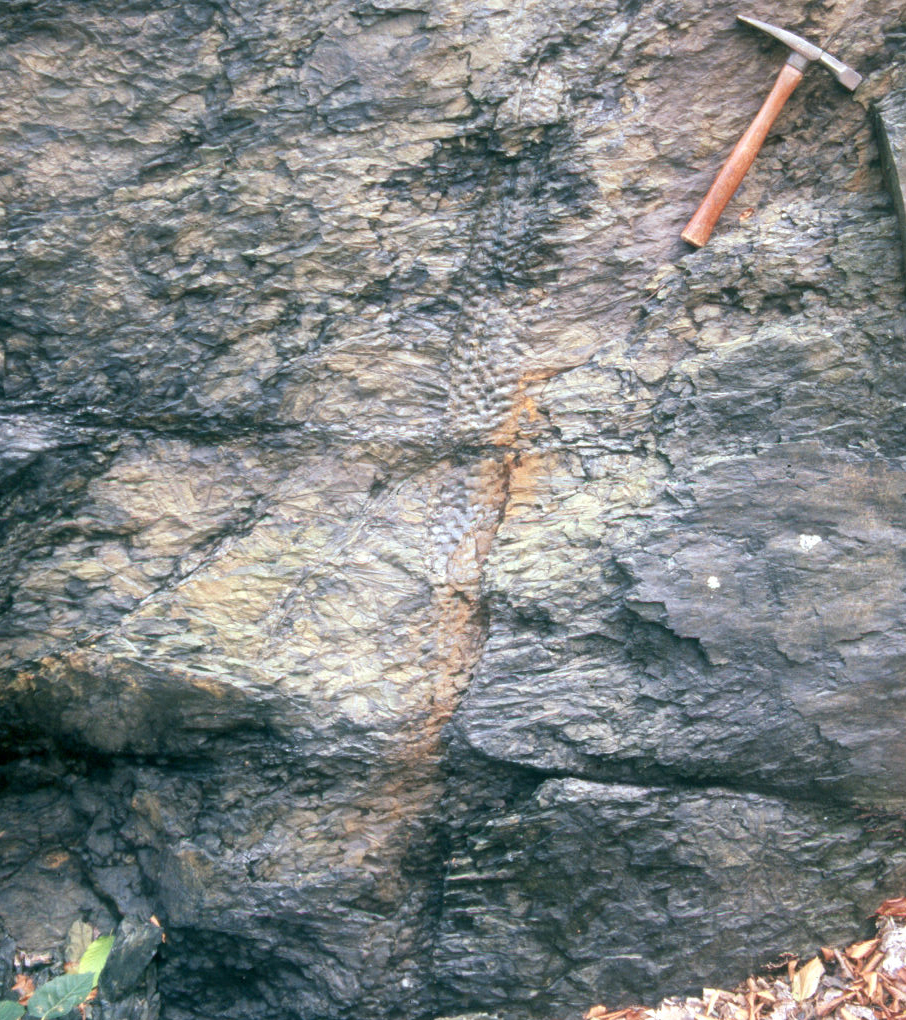
Stigmaria root fossils
