= The Beam (fairy tale) =

German fairy tale

Folk tale
- Name: The Beam
- Aarne–Thompson grouping: ATU 987; ATU 1290
- Country: Germany
- Published in: Grimms' Fairy Tales

"The Beam" (German: Der Hahnenbalken) is a German fairy tale collected by the Brothers Grimm as tale 149. It is Aarne-Thompson type 987, False Magician Exposed by Clever Girl, with an episode like type 1290, A Fool Mistakes a Flax Field for a Lake.

== Synopsis ==
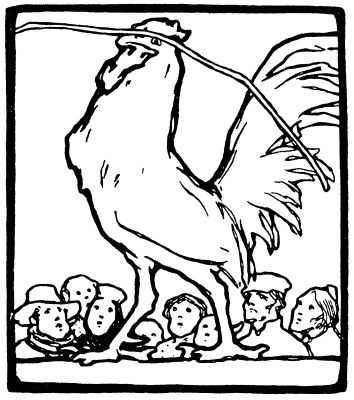
A rooster carrying a beam

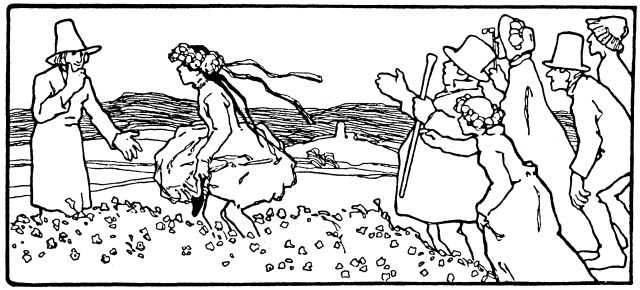
The girl with skirts up

A magician shows a rooster carrying a beam. A girl carrying a four-leafed clover realizes and declares that it is just a straw, not a beam. When she marries, the magician enchants her to think she sees a stream and then breaks the spell after she has hiked up her skirts to cross it, which turned out to be a flax field.
