= SS Beme =

A number of ships have been named Beme, including –

- SS Beme (1904), a Panamanian tanker in service until sunk by enemy action in 1940
- SS Beme (1945), a Burmese tanker in service 1946–64
