= Slickenside =

Smoothly polished surface in geology

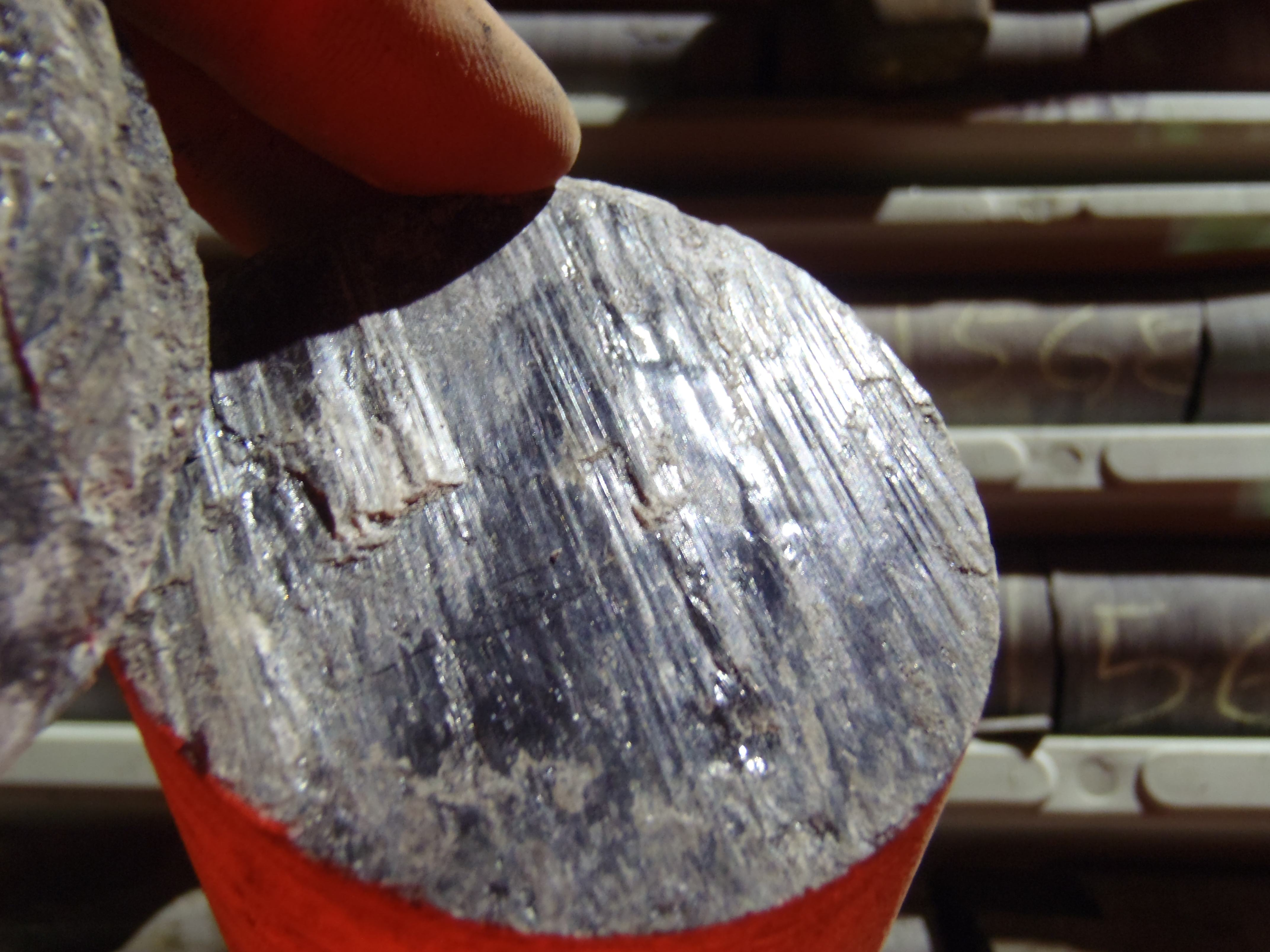
Slickenlines at 500m depth in a Permian sandstone

In geology, a slickenside is a smoothly polished surface caused by frictional movement between rocks along a fault. This surface is typically striated with linear features, called slickenlines, in the direction of movement.

== Geometry of slickensides ==
A slickenside can occur as a single surface at a fault between two hard surfaces. Alternatively, the gouge between the fault surfaces may contain many anastamosing slip surfaces that host slickensides. These slip surfaces are on the order of 100 micrometers thick, and the size of the grains that constitute the surface are ultra-fine (0.01–1 micrometers in diameter). These grains are unlike typical grains of fault rock in that they have irregular grain boundaries and few crystal lattice defects (termed dislocations).

Slickensides have conspicuous shapes that can be used to determine the direction of movement along the fault. Straight slickenlines indicate linear-translational fault motion. They are parallel to the direction of fault motion and serve as a kinematic indicator. Curved slickenlines have recently been studied for their potential to preserve the direction of earthquake rupture propagation.

=== Surface roughness ===
Slickenside formation results in unique roughness on a slip surface. Fault surface roughness (or topography) is characterized by the aspect ratio of asperity height to scale of observation, and this roughness is a key parameter in the study of fault slip. In general, a fault surface appears rougher at smaller scales (i.e., rough and bumpy at approximately millimetre scales and smaller, and increasingly smooth with larger fields of view). This smoothing with larger observation scales is more pronounced in the slip-parallel direction than the slip-perpendicular direction and is commonly a result of slickenside formation.

== Mechanisms to create slickensides ==
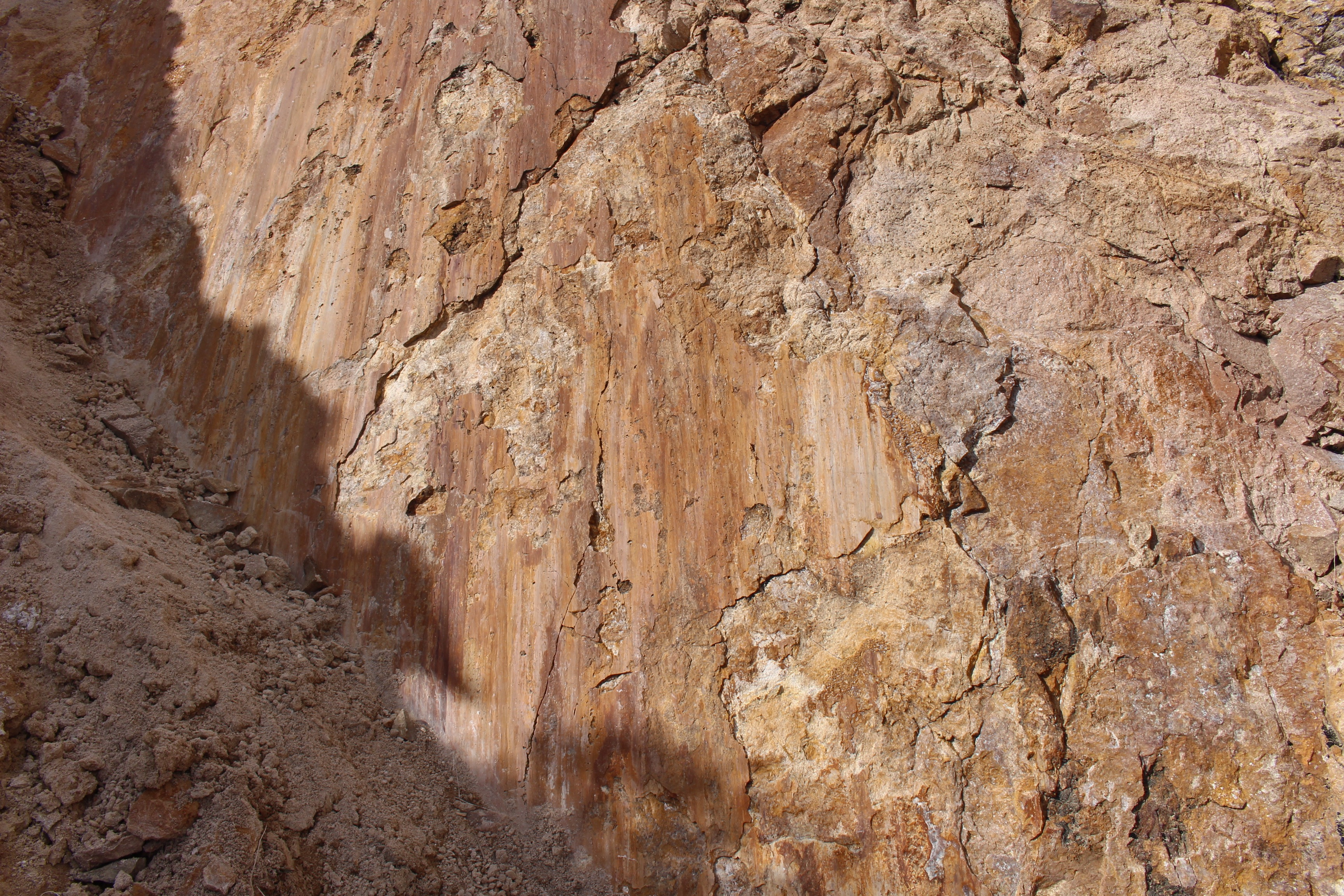
Mirror slickenside on scarp of Fairview Fault, Dixie Valley, Nevada, USA

The unique geometry of a slickenside can be created in a variety of ways, but the precise mechanisms that create them is not well understood. The grinding between two rocks produces granular material, and there is a change in the behaviour of wear material when the particle size is reduced to nanometers. When the particle size is reduced so dramatically that the surface becomes shiny, it can be characterized as a fault mirror.

A fault mirror may also be the result of fluid being present at the fault surface during slip. Once slip has stopped, this fluid solidifies as a silica gel, which appears shiny and hosts slickenlines.

=== Asperity plowing ===
An asperity on a fault surface is a bump or point with higher relief than the area around it. The asperity, when pressed into the opposing rock surface and then moved, digs into the opposing rock, forming troughs, grooves, and scratches. Asperity plowing is thus a result of permanent deformation in the brittle regime at a small scale.

=== Debris streaking ===
When an asperity plows into the opposing rock, it wears itself and the opposing rock down and produces fine debris. This debris, or wear product, accumulates both in front of and behind the asperity in a long, elongated shape. If the asperity is relatively hard, the debris will accumulate in front of the asperity. If the asperity is relatively soft, the debris will trail behind. This debris hardens over time and is preserved as a form of slickenline.

=== Erosional sheltering ===
Some rocks may contain particles that are harder than the rest of the rock. When these rocks are worn, the harder particles will resist wear more than the softer rock, the rock on the lee side of the hard particle will be protected from wear. This creates a tail that starts abruptly as a crag where the hard particle was located and is elongated parallel to the direction of movement down-slip from the particle.

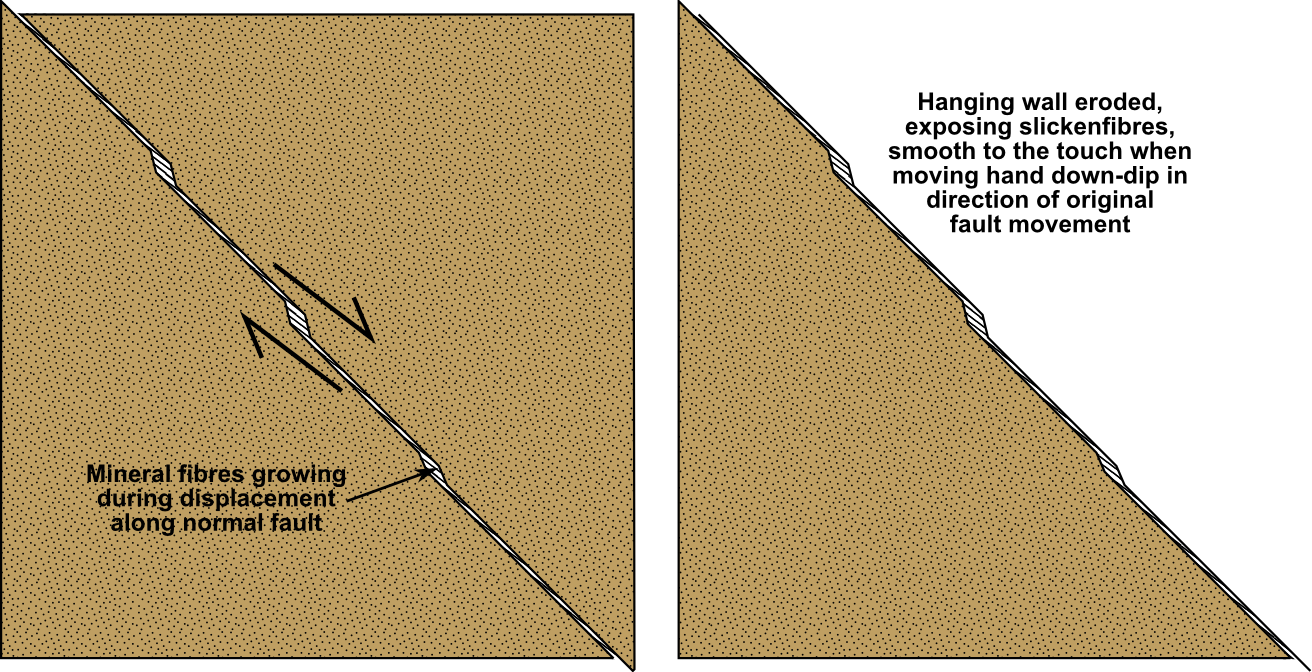
How slickenfibre steps form and show sense of movement on a fault.

=== Fibre growth ===
The fault plane may be coated by mineral fibres that grew during the fault movement, known as slickenfibres. Due to irregularities in the fault plane, exposed slickenfibres typically have a stepped appearance that can be used to determine the sense of movement across the fault.

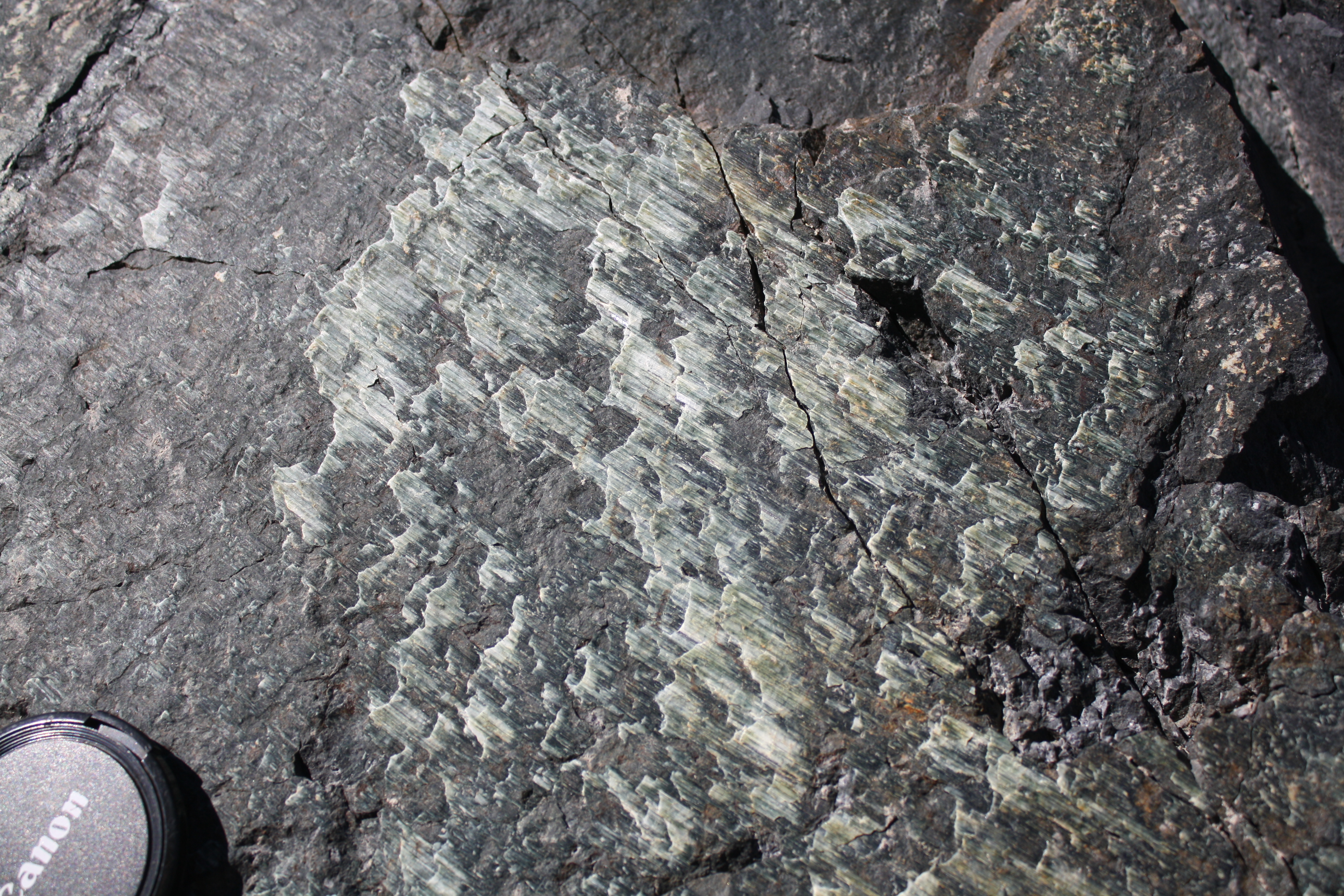
Calcite-chlorite slickenfibres on a small fault cutting greenschist-facies metavolcanic rocks of the Saddlebag Lake Roof Pendant, Sierra Nevada, California

Slickenfibres are secondary minerals that make up the slickensides rather than the rock itself. Slickenfibres form in areas where the rock slowly creep past one another rather than sliding suddenly as a result of an earthquake. Unlike slickenlines, which give two possibilities for slip direction, slickenfibres preserve the true slip direction.

== Implications ==
Slickensides provide useful insight into earthquake processes. Calcite slickenfibres have recently been used to constrain the depth of aseismic creep in the Zagros Mountains as well as the orientation of stress acting on the fault. It has also been suggested that when multiple slickenfibre or slickensteps orientations are present, it can indicate that the ongoing shear is not strain softening so slip does not have a constant direction.

In addition to the direction of slip, slickenlines have also been used to constrain the timing of fault slip. They also preserve any complexity in the geometry of the earthquake rupture.

== Other types of slickensides ==
=== Slickensides in soils ===
In pedology, the study of soils in their natural environments, a slickenside is a surface of the cracks produced in soils containing a high proportion of swelling clays. Slickensides are a type of cutan. In the Australian Soil Classification, slickensides, along with lenticular structural aggregates, are an indicator of a vertisol.

=== Slickensides on the Moon ===
On the Moon, a boulder with slickensides, discovered in a debris-strewn small crater at Station 9 near Rima Hadley, was photographed during a moonwalk by the crew of Apollo 15.

== Gallery ==
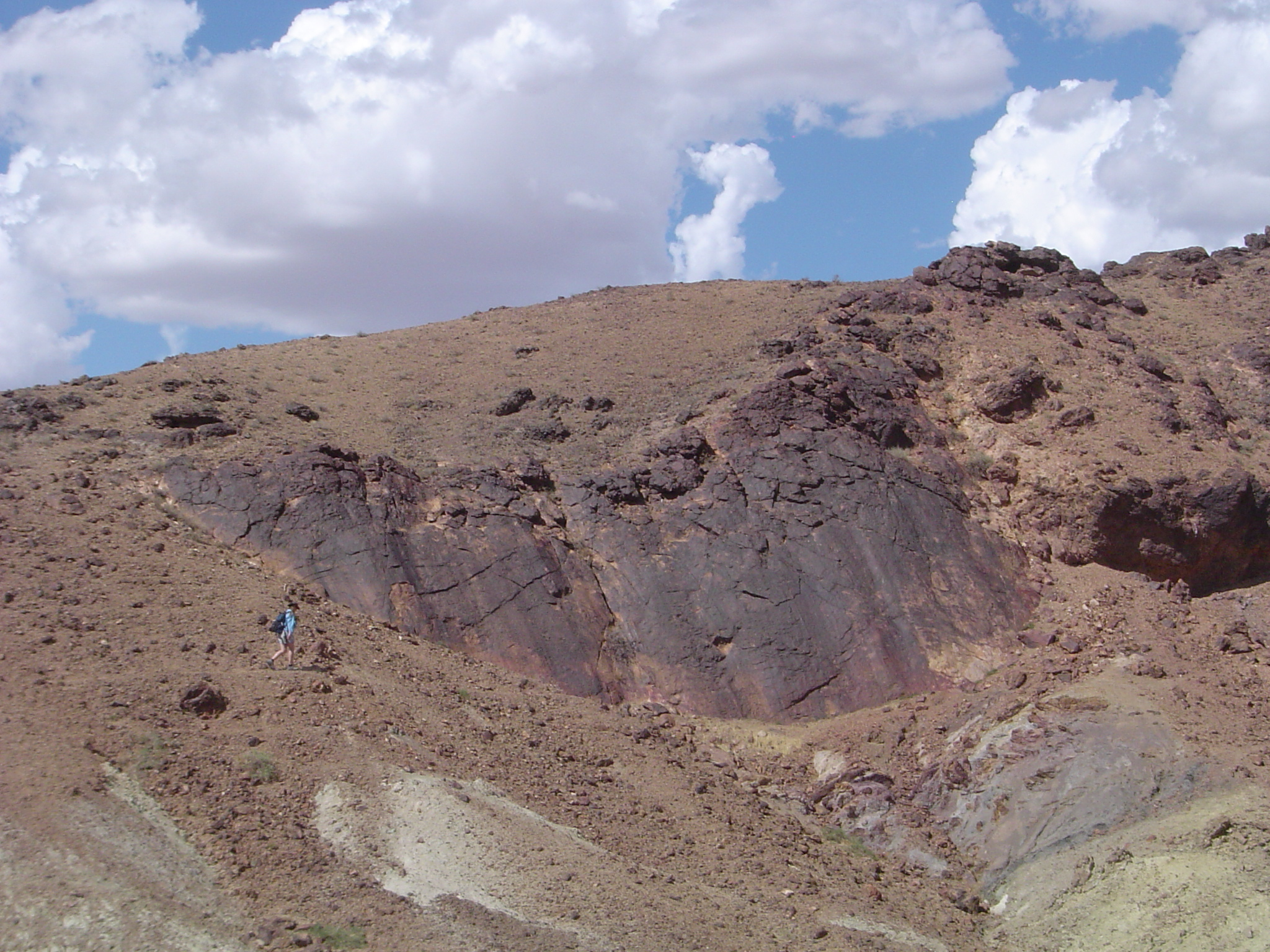
An exposed reverse fault plane with large slickenlines. Gobi, Mongolia.

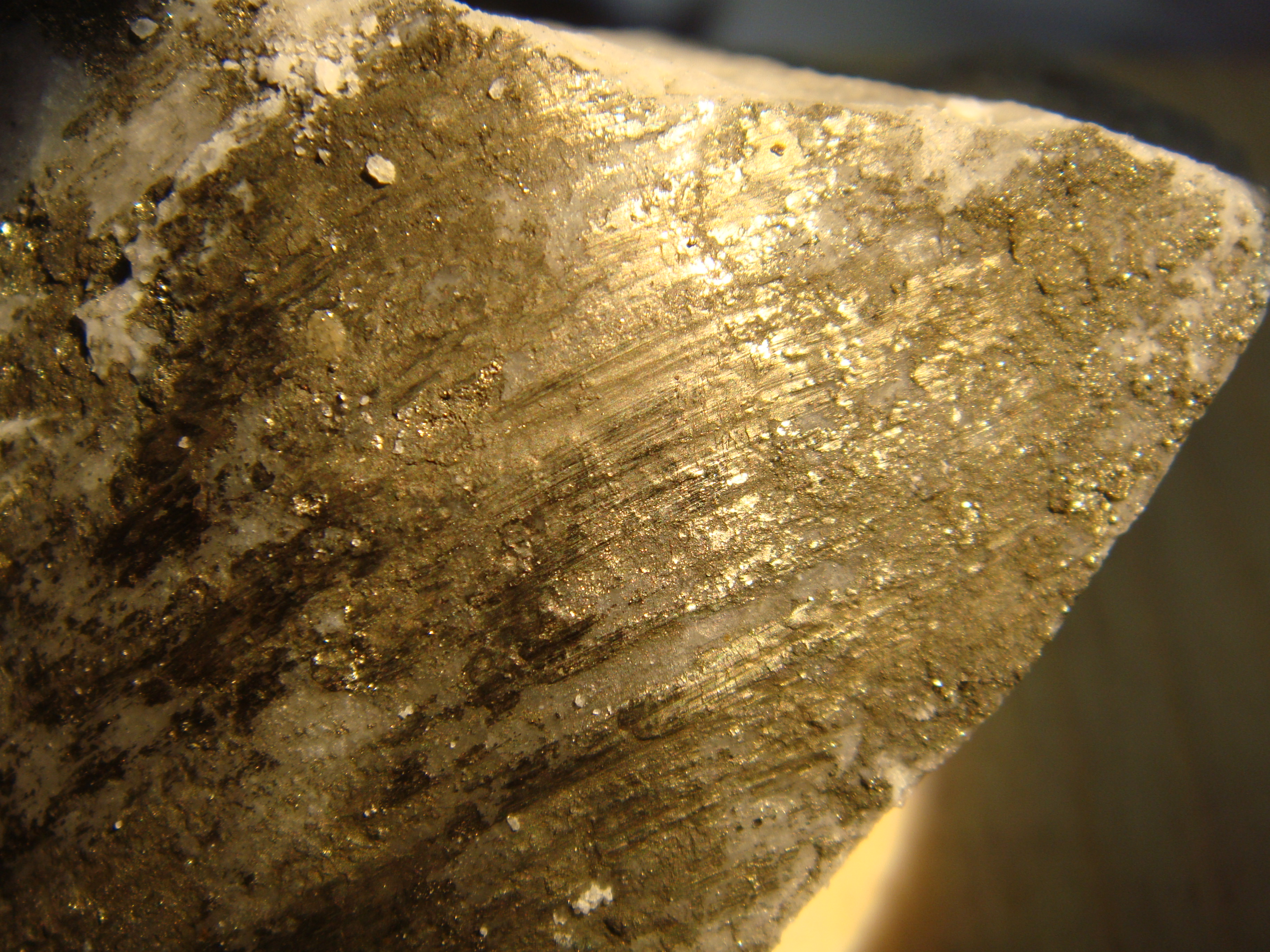
Dextral slickenside of pyrite

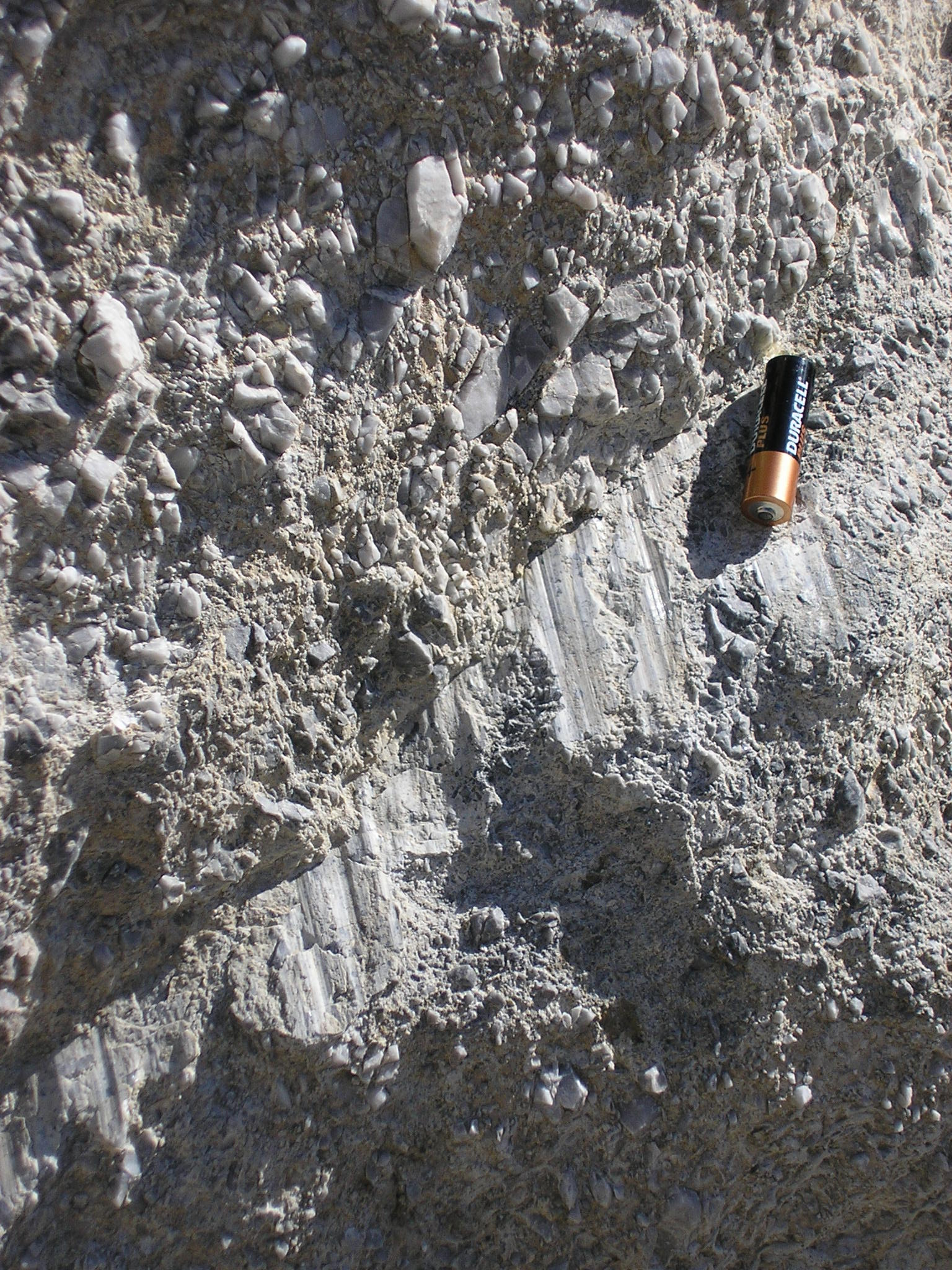
Slickensides developed on the surface of a small fault in quartzite in the Alpujarras

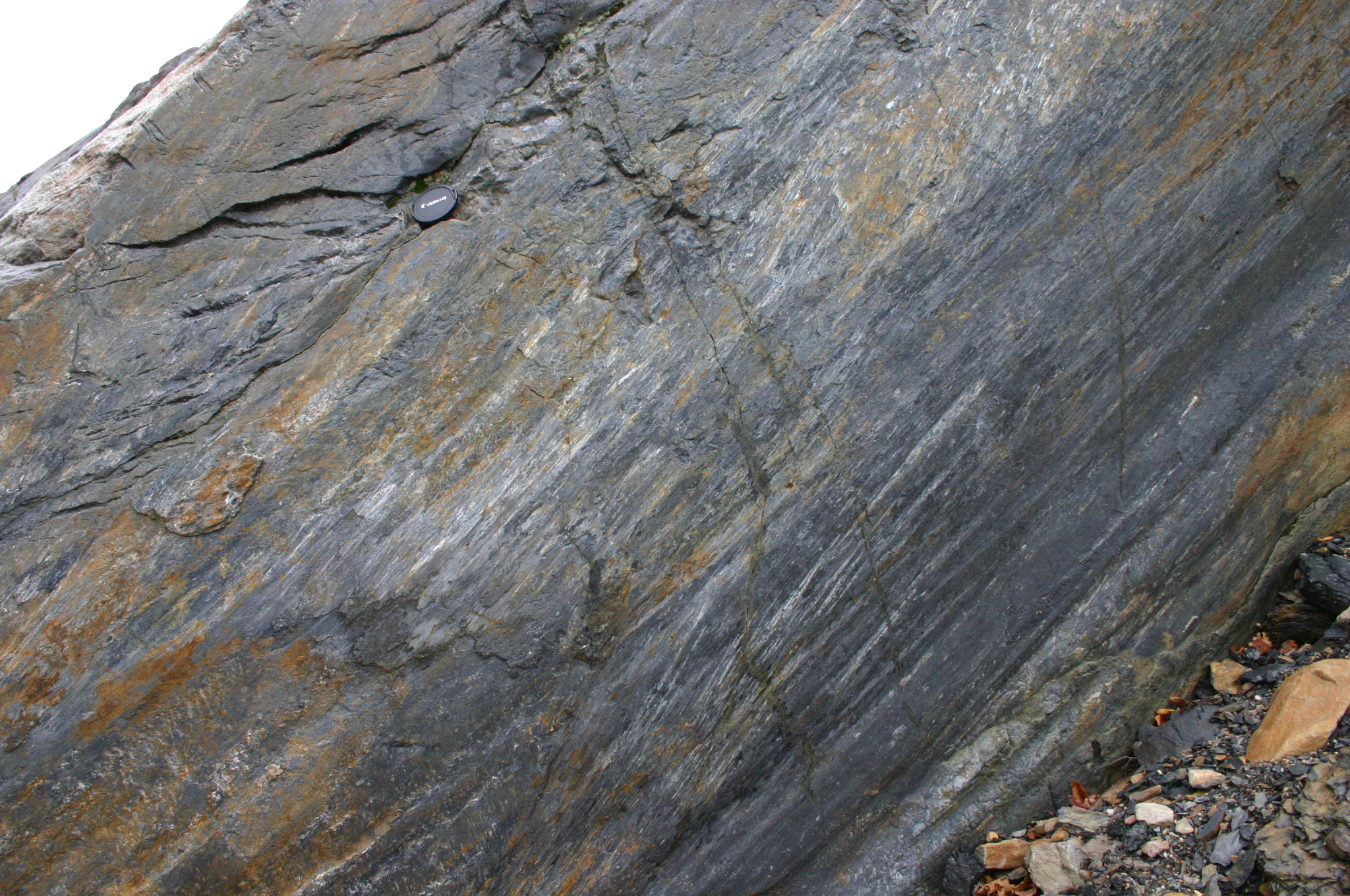
Slickensides on a fault plane, south wall of Bear Valley Strip Mine. Lens cap 5.8cm wide.

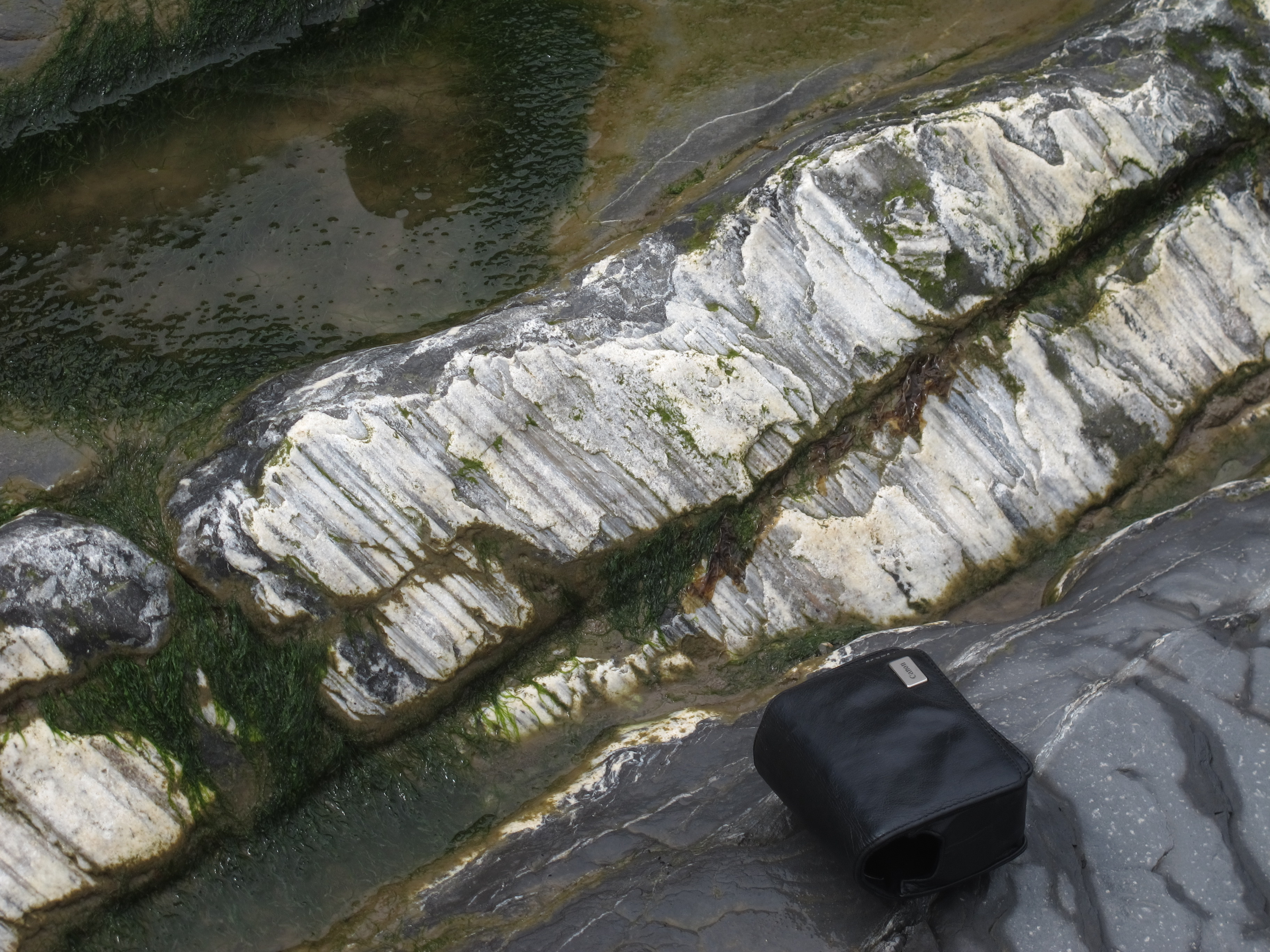
Calcite slickenfibres on the surface of a normal fault, east of Kilve, Somerset.

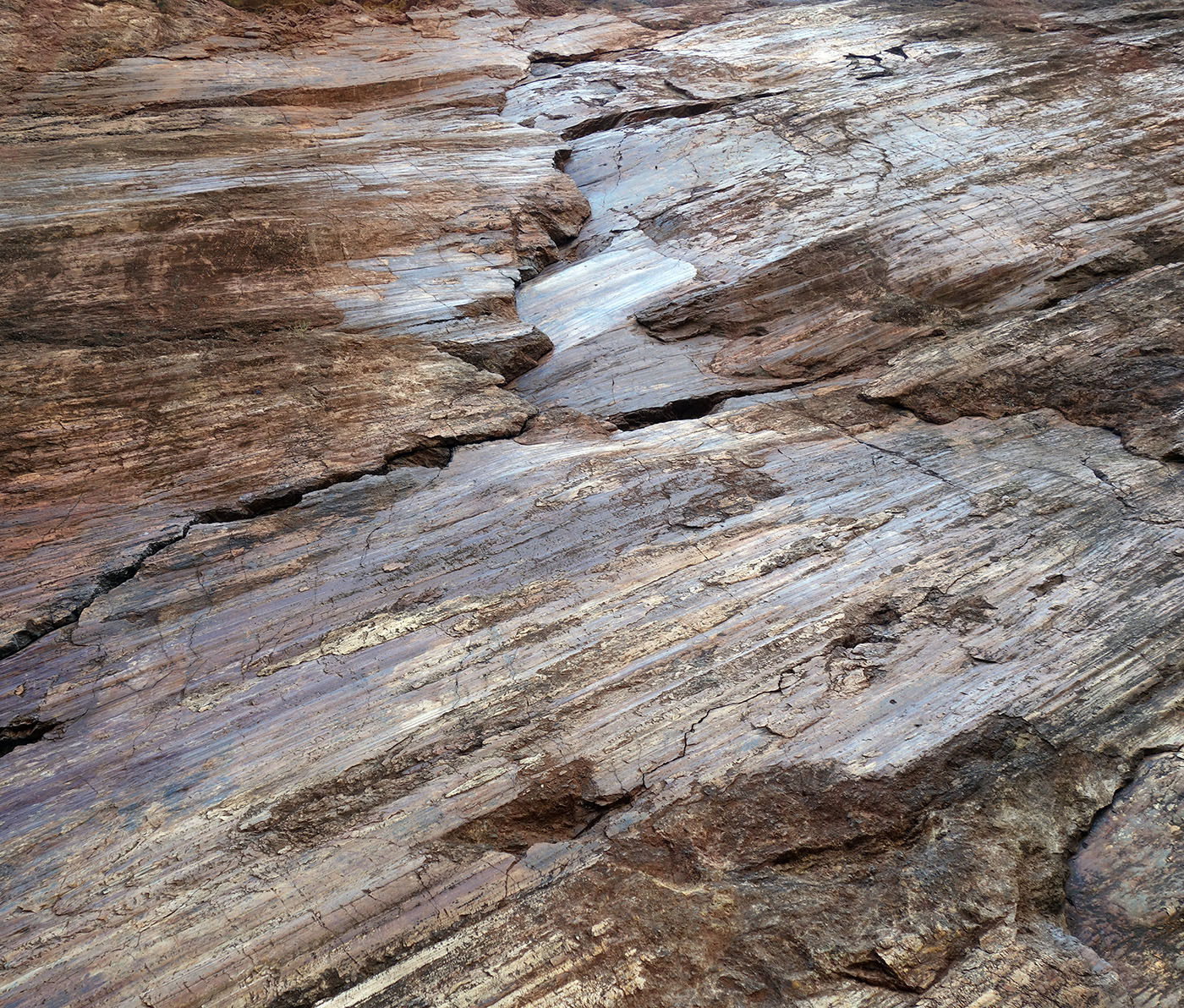
Slickensides on a fault plane in Corona Heights Park, San Francisco
