= Joline Beam =

American politician from Lewiston, Maine

Joline Beam is an American politician from Lewiston, Maine. A former member of the Maine House of Representatives, Beam now serves on the Lewiston City Council.
