= Llewellyn Formation =

Mapped bedrock unit in Pennsylvania, U.S.

- Stratigraphic range: Late Pennsylvanian; ~308–300 Ma
- A hand sample of the bottom of the Llewellyn from St. Clair, Pennsylvania
- Type: Sedimentary
- Unit of: none
- Sub-units: none (most economic coal beds are named)
- Overlies: Pottsville Formation
- Thickness: up to 1,500 feet (460 m)

Lithology
- Primary: Sandstone
- Other: Shale, Conglomerate, Coal

Location
- Region: Appalachian Basin of eastern North America
- Extent: Anthracite fields of Pennsylvania

Type section
- Named for: Llewellyn, Pennsylvania
- Named by: G. Wood, 1964

The Llewellyn Formation is a mapped bedrock unit in eastern Pennsylvania. It was previously known as the "coal measures" and the post-Pottsville rocks. The formation is named for the community of Llewellyn in Schuylkill County.

== Description ==
The Llewellyn is defined as a gray, fine- to coarse-grained sandstone, siltstone, shale, conglomerate, and anthracite coal in repetitive sequences. Although gray (light to dark) is the dominant color, other colors described include: buff, dark to light brown, and black. It contains the worlds thickest anthracite coal bed, the Mammoth vein.

=== Depositional environment ===
The Llewellyn was deposited upon a broad flat plain with sediment-choked rivers delivering detritus from the eroding uplands that were located to the southeast. Fluctuations in sea level, coupled with the shifting nature of the rivers and highlands, allowed dense forests to grow on the broad plain. As a result, a large amount of organic matter was buried and eventually turned to coal. The repetitive nature of these sediments have been well documented and are often called cyclothems.

=== Fossils ===
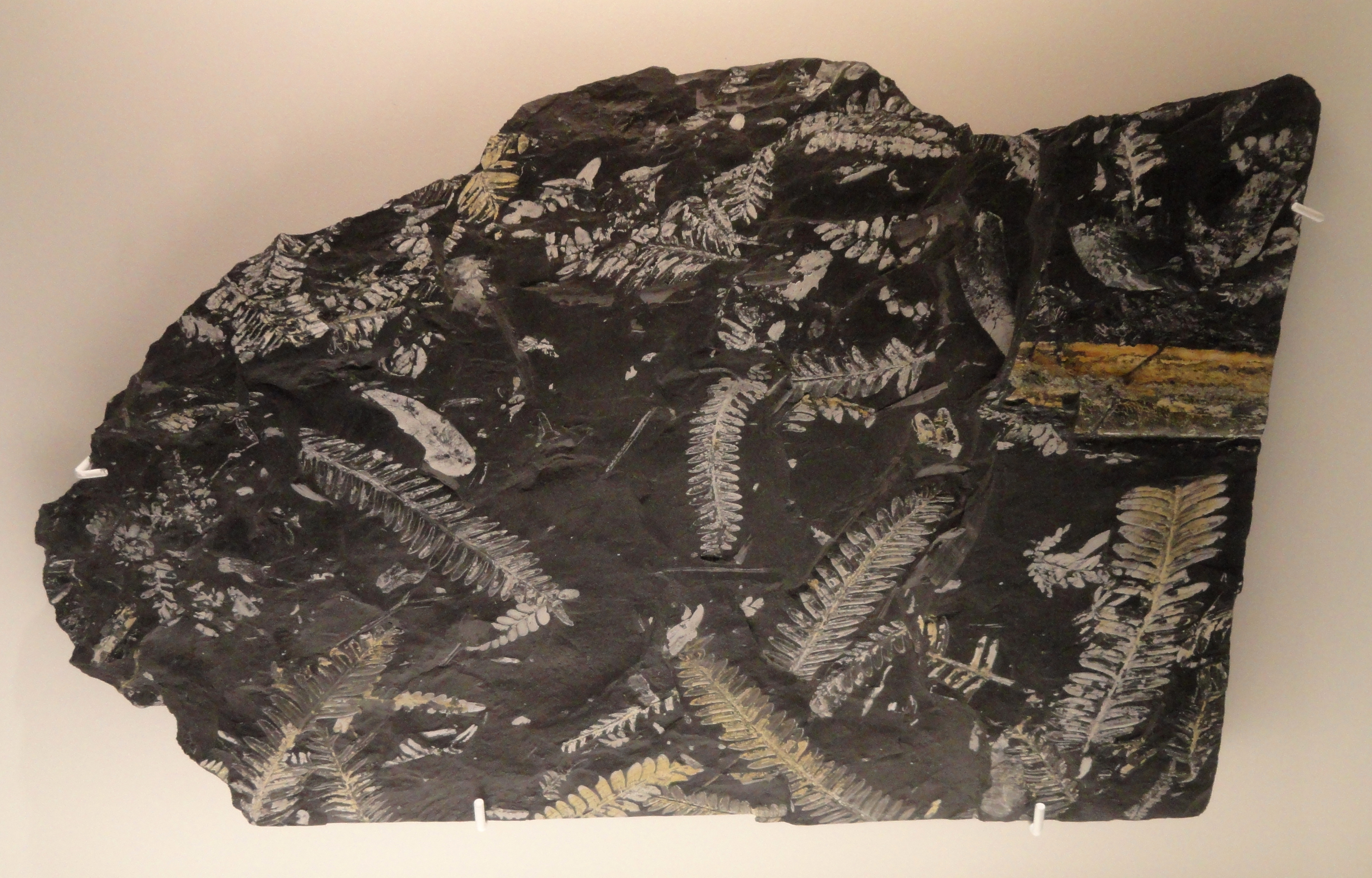
Alethopteris serli and Neuropteris sp., Carboniferous (Pennsylvanian), Llewellyn Formation, St. Clair, Schuylkill County, Pennsylvania, US - Houston Museum of Natural Science - DSC01757

Nearly 100 fossil species have been identified in the Llewellyn; almost all of them plants. The major divisions of flora that have been recognized include: Lycopodiophyta, Arthrophyta, Pteridophyta, and Pteridospermatophyta. Fossils have been recovered from every rock type in the Llewellyn but are predominantly found in the siltstone, shale, and coal layers. The compression fossils from the Llewellyn formation are well known for the striking white color on the dark stone. An important location for these fossils is near St. Clair, Pennsylvania.

=== Notable exposures ===
- Bear Valley Strip Mine, located west of Shamokin in Northumberland County, Pennsylvania

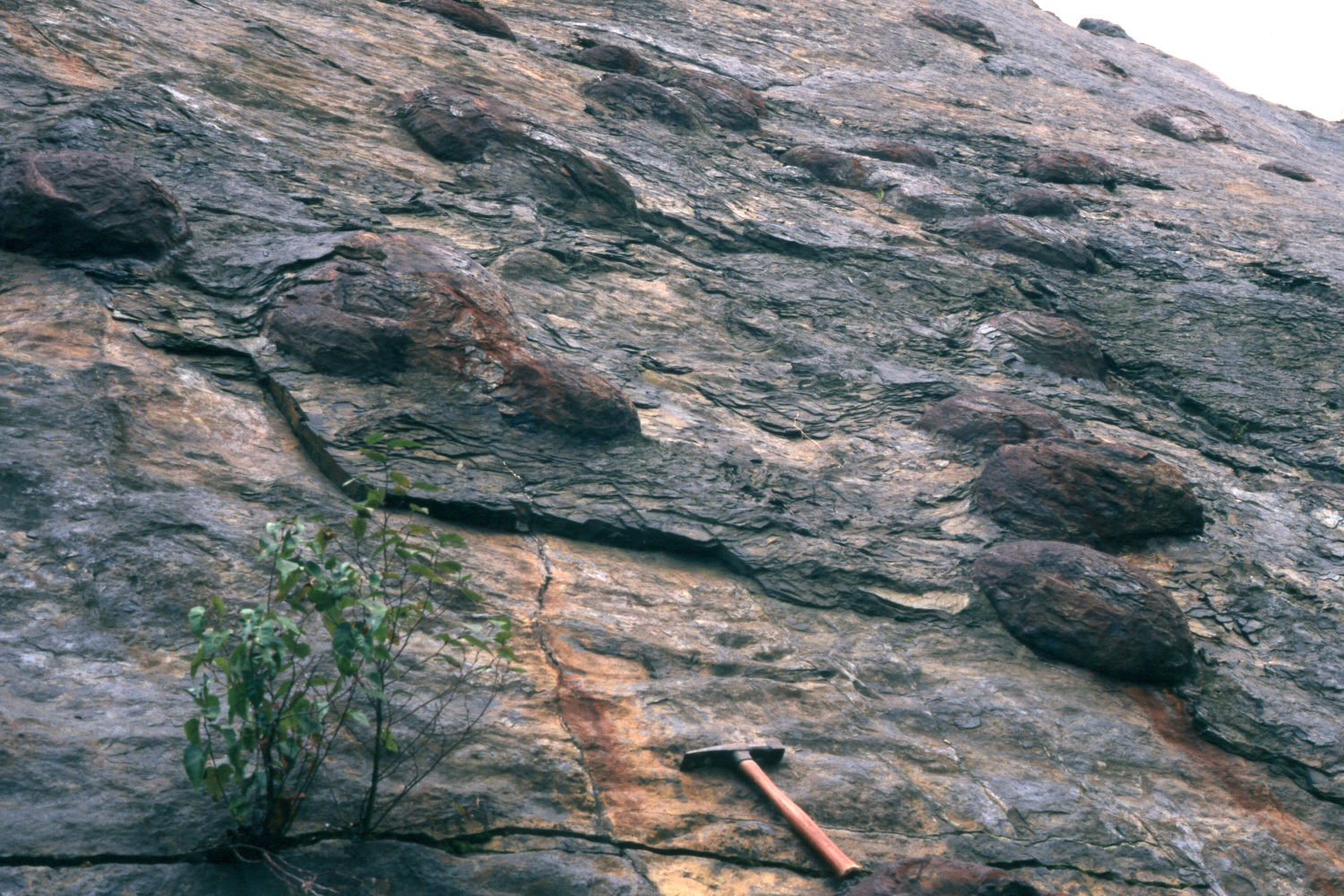
Concretions of the Llewellyn Formation in the south wall of the Bear Valley Strip Mine, located west of Shamokin in Northumberland County, Pennsylvania

== Age ==
Relative and fossil age dating of the Llewellyn places it in the late-Middle to Late Pennsylvanian, being deposited between 308 and 300 (±1) million years ago. It was thought that the uppermost beds of the Llewellyn were of Permian in age, but no fossils have been found from that era. The bottom of the formation is placed either at the bottom of Buck Mountain (no. 5) coal bed or at the bottom of the underclay or shale bed below this coal measure. Since this is the last bed deposited in the Appalachian Basin in eastern Pennsylvania that still exists, only recent alluvial and colluvial deposits rest on top.

== Economic use ==
The economic gains of this formation have been exploited to their greatest potential in years past. The peak year of anthracite production was in 1917 when nearly 100 million tons were mined. Anthracite production has declined every year since then. Recently, the old spoils of the mining operations (culm) have been refined to extract more coal for power production. There are 40 coal seams in the Llewellyn the largest is the Mammoth vein which is nearly 20 feet thick.

== See also ==
- Geology of Pennsylvania
