= M'Chigeeng First Nation =

M'Chigeeng 22
- Indian reserve
- M'Chigeeng (West Bay) Indian Reserve No. 22
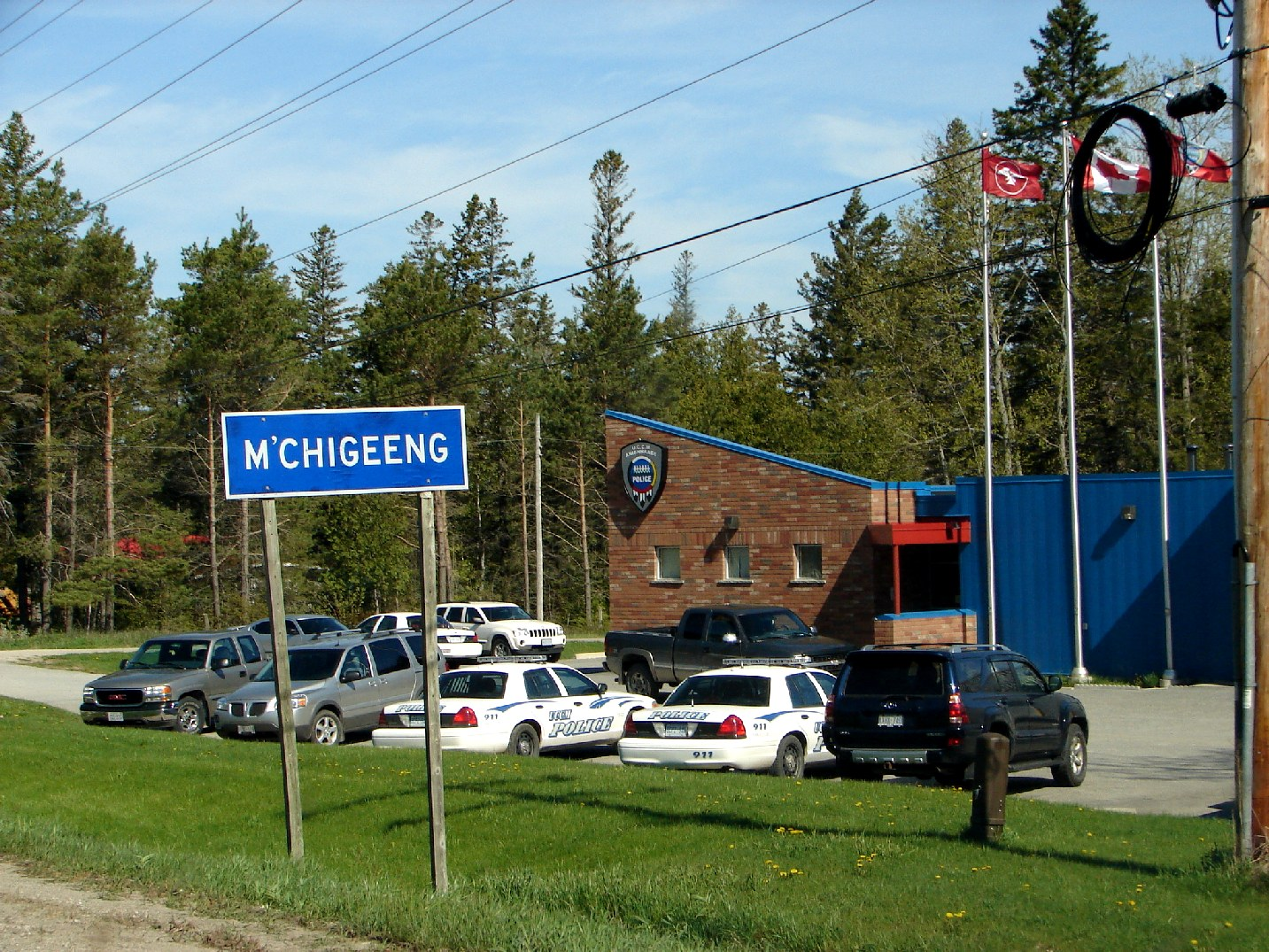

- Location within Southern Ontario
- Coordinates: 45°50′N 82°10′W
- Country: Canada
- Province: Ontario
- District: Manitoulin
- First Nation: M'Chigeeng

Area
  - Land: 32.90 km^{2} (12.70 sq mi)

Population (2018)
  - Total: 939
  - Density: 27.3/km^{2} (71/sq mi)
- Website: www.mchigeeng.ca

M'Chigeeng First Nation, also known as West Bay, is an Ojibwe First Nation band government in the Manitoulin District of Ontario, Canada. The total registered population as of December 2018, was 2623 people, of which their on-reserve population was 939. The First Nation have reserved for themselves the 3094.7 ha M'Chigeeng 22 Indian Reserve located on Manitoulin Island.

== Governance ==
M'Chigeeng First Nation leadership are elected on a three-year term. Currently, the First Nation is governed by Chief Glen Hare and 10 Councillors: Gail Payette, Jeannie Debassige, Grace Debassige Ray Corbiere, Matthew Corbiere, Andrew Corbiere, Travis Corbiere, Debbie Ense, Robert Beaudin & Summer Beaudin until September 2029. The First Nation is a member of the United Chiefs & Councils of Manitoulin Island, a regional tribal Chiefs' council.

== Media and events ==
On February 11, 2010, Anong Migwans Beam, on behalf of a corporation to be incorporated applied to the CRTC for a new English and aboriginal-language Type B Native FM radio programming low-power FM radio station in M’Chigeeng. The applicant proposes a format completely devoted to the recovery and sustainment of the Ojibwe language. Programming would include educational and music programs. The station began broadcasting late in the summer of 2010 and is known as CHYF-FM.

The community is the primary home of the annual Weengushk International Film Festival, although some events associated with the festival are also held in other communities on Manitoulin Island.

== Pictures ==
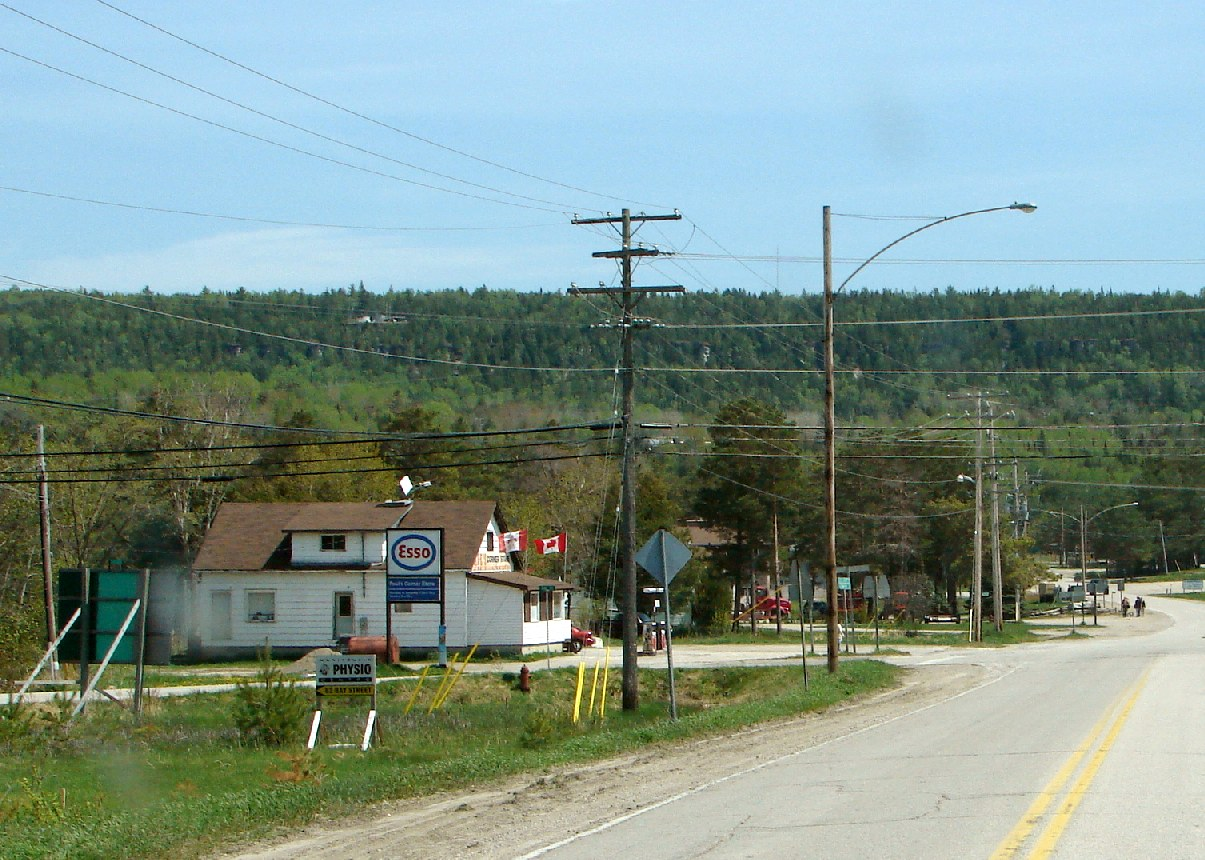
M'Chigeeng, Ontario

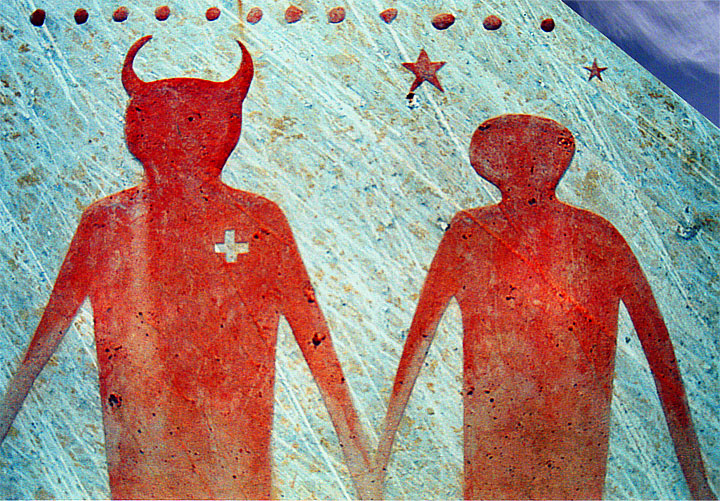
Ojibwe Cultural Foundation, M'Chigeeng, Ontario

== Notable citizens ==
- Carl Beam, visual artist
- Blake Debassige, artist

== See also ==
- Kenjgewin Teg Educational Institute
