= Carl Beam =

Indigenous Canadian artist (1943–2005)

- Born: Carl Edward Migwans; May 24, 1943; M'Chigeeng First Nation, Manitoulin Island, Ontario
- Died: July 30, 2005 (aged 62); Ottawa General Hospital, Ottawa, Ontario
- Resting place: M'Chigeeng First Nation
- Education: University of Victoria, University of Alberta
- Occupation: Artist
- Known for: painter, potter, graphic artist
- Spouse: Ann Elena Weatherby
- Children: 6, including Anong Beam

Carl Beam RCA (May 24, 1943 – July 30, 2005), born Carl Edward Migwans, was an Indigenous Canadian multi-media artist whose career confronted Canada's colonial legacy through innovate means of creativity. His work engaged with the contemporary issues and experiences of the Indigenous peoples of Turtle Island. Beam made Canadian art history as the first artist of Indigenous Ancestry (Ojibwe), to have his work purchased by the National Gallery of Canada as Contemporary Art. A major retrospective of his work was organized by the National Gallery of Canada in 2010. He worked in various photographic mediums, mixed media, oil, acrylic, spontaneously scripted text on canvas, works on paper, Plexiglas, stone, cement, wood, handmade ceramic pottery, and found objects, in addition to etching, lithography, and screen process.

== Personal life ==
Carl Beam was born Carl Edward Migwans on May 24, 1943, in M'Chigeeng First Nation, to father Edward Cooper and mother Barbara Migwans. His mother was the daughter of Dominic Migwans, Ojibwe West Bay Chief (later renamed M'Chigeeng First Nation). "The Beam family's true name derives from miigwaans which means little feather or bird." His father was an American soldier stationed in Philadelphia, Pennsylvania. He served in the 77th Armor Regiment during World War II; he died as a prisoner-of-war in 1945 Bad Soden, Germany.

He recounted to his daughter, artist Anong Migwans Beam, that he was mainly raised by his grandparents. His exceptional qualities were observed by his elders, and he was given the name "Ahkideh", derived from the Ojibwe word for "one who is brave"." This name was meant to honour Beam's connection to the bear, his spirit animal. He was sent to Garnier Residential School, in Spanish, Ontario, from the age of ten until eighteen. Beam married his first wife in the early 1960s. They had five children, Clinton, Veronica, Laila, Carl Jr., and Jennifer. The marriage was later annulled. Beam married Ann Elena Weatherby, and they had a daughter Anong.

Beam died on July 30, 2005, in his home on M'chigeeng Reserve on Manitoulin Island, Ontario from complications due to diabetes.

== Education ==
Beam's mother was not able to get an education, so she was eager to enrol Carl in a local school. She sent him to Garnier High School in Spanish, Ontario, a residential school run by the Jesuits. While there, Beam was subjected to horrible conditions and abuse that led him to drop out in Grade 10. Despite this, he completed his education ahead of schedule by taking correspondence course.

After working at a variety of jobs, from construction work on the Toronto subway to working as a millwright in Wawa, Ontario, Beam enrolled at the Kootenay School of Art (1971). He went on to earn a Bachelor of Fine Arts from the University of Victoria in 1974, and entered into post-graduate studies at the University of Alberta, (1975–1976). While at the University of Alberta, Beam wanted to write on Fritz Scholder (1937–2005), a contemporary Indigenous artist, but his professors deemed it an unworthy topic. Offended by this, Beam left his studies and returned to Ontario.

== Early work ==
The direction of Carl Beam's visual style was firmly established by the late seventies. In 1979, Beam met and married his wife, Ann Beam. "In developing his work over the years, Beam has been accompanied by his wife, Ann, herself an artist and a former teacher at the Art Gallery of Ontario. Often they have worked as collaborators". At this time he incorporated multiple photographic images onto a single picture plane. "He disregarded the illusory deep space of Renaissance depiction, in favour of a flat tableau, where a dialogue of multiple images could take place". At this time his photographic imagery was achieved primarily via screen process, photo-etching, Polaroid instant prints, and a solvent transfer technique also used by Robert Rauschenberg.

== Living in the Southwestern United States ==
In 1980, Beam and his wife, Ann, and daughter, Anong, moved to Arroyo Seco, New Mexico to live and work. "We developed a dialogue together in everyday living, politics, world events, ceramic technique, painting, and all things art, that would continue for the next 26 years". Said Beam of the time,

"It was in the southwest years later with Ann and Anong, who was a baby, that I saw my first Mimbres bowl, or rather a cupboard full of Mimbres bowls in a gallery on the square in downtown Santa Fe, New Mexico. Some were completely intact, some had been restored, but all shared a bold adventurous design. When I discovered they were done 1,000 years ago, I was completely surprised."

Beam and his wife Ann exhibited their ceramic work together in The Painted Pottery of Ann and Carl Beam at the Maxwell Museum of Anthropology, University of New Mexico, Albuquerque, New Mexico.

== Ceramic works and pottery ==
Beam minored in ceramic pottery at the Kootenay School of Art. Despite having received an excellent training, he found he lacked the ability to express himself as compared to his ability with canvas or paper. Beam abandoned pottery as an art form but only temporarily. Years later in 1980 while living in Santa Fe, New Mexico, Beam again became interested in handmade pottery via his exposure to Santa Clara pottery and Mimbres bowls that were made by the Anasazi who lived in the area centuries before.

In the words of Ann Beam, "It was the Santa Clara blackwares that got us first". Beam became excited with the adventurous and bold designs he observed in these works. Eventually he met Rose Montaya who further exposed him to her techniques and those passed down from her mother. Having learned much from Rose, Beam was able to find his own clay and paint stones, fire outside with dried dung or wood, and experiment extensively – about 70% of the early works were lost due to trial and error – all works were handmade without a wheel, often unglazed and polished with a stone.

Figure 1 - Inside of handmade pottery by Carl Beam

Figure 2 - Outside of handmade pottery by Carl Beam

His Mimbres bowls were fabricated as a modern version of the ancient Anasazi ones - on the interior they were generally cream colored and quite smooth whereas the exterior appeared almost disregarded and less important (see Figures 1 and 2). Having studied all available exemplars found in museums, art galleries, shops, books, and otherwise, Beam's contemporary versions were largely influenced by the materials and sophisticated art dialogue present in the Anasazi works he saw. Also in the Anasazi tradition, Beam's bowls typically featured a bold design around the rim with his own unique images placed in the center. The result of his and Ann's early work was an exhibition in 1982 entitled "The Painted Pottery of Ann and Carl Beam" at the Maxwell Museum of Anthropology of the University of New Mexico in Albuquerque, with other shows to follow later.

Beam preferred the Mimbres bowl because it was a form conducive to his creative expression: "Finally, one form I could use to be absolutely creative in … the hemispherical quality of a large bowl still excites me like no cup, tea pot, plate or other clay shape can do…it is a universe unto itself where anything can happen – the designs are limitless."

Beam continued to work on and off in pottery, creating bowls, snake pots and other handmade creations almost always decorated with his designs and images. The raven is featured prominently in many of his works – "Migwans", Beam's family name, means "feather" or "bird". His works also feature news events (such as the Anwar Sadat assassination) or self-portraits or the shaman figure and family, a theme often returned to (seen in Figure 1) Beam also shared the techniques learned and developed with others including his cousin David Migwans, now an accomplished artist living in M'Chigeeng First Nation, Manitoulin Island.

== Return to Canada ==
Although he had achieved a level of success in the United States, with art dealers in both Taos, and Santa Fe, Beam returned to Canada, where he felt his work had an important contribution to make. "A return to Canada in 1983 at first meant no change in format: one ceramic work by Beam of a shaman family, in the collection of the Woodland Cultural Centre in Brantford, Ontario, has the central image Beam favoured in New Mexico, though now one that represents his current situation. Here a shaman figure holds the hands of a figure to either side, likely a veiled reference to his wife, Ann, and his daughter, Anongonse, born in 1980." The family moved to Peterborough, Ontario, and in 1984, Beam was commissioned to make an art work for the Thunder Bay Art Gallery. He titled the piece Exorcism. This became part of a "breakthrough exhibition" for him, which had a catalogue, and was titled Altered Egos the Multi-media Artwork of Carl Beam. It was curated by Elizabeth McLuhan. Living in the east end of Peterborough, Ontario, Beam created an early set of large format etchings, consisting of nine prints. There are many signature images in this print collection, which Beam later used to form the image backbone of his iconic work The North American Iceberg. This work was purchased by the National Gallery of Canada, making Beam the first artist of Native ancestry to have his work purchased into the permanent collection of the National Gallery of Canada as contemporary art.

== Mature style ==
By the mid-1980s, Beam was working with new techniques for incorporating photo-imagery into his work. He utilized a heat transfer technique learned from fellow artist Ann Beam, with his work on paper and Plexiglas. He also began working with photo emulsion and mixed media on paper and large-scale canvas works. The works contained various juxtapositions of imagery from the spiritual, the natural, and political world, and incorporated his own poetic inscriptions and math equations. "My works are like little puzzles, interesting little games. I play a game of dreaming ourselves as each other. In this we find out that we're all basically human.... My work is not fabricated for the art market. There's no market for intellectual puzzles or works of spiritual emancipation"

In 1986, the National Gallery of Canada purchased Beam's iconic work The North American Iceberg, 1985. Beam was asking $60,000 when selling the piece, but the National Gallery's negotiations resulted in the purchase price ending up at $16,000. Even though Beam was not paid the full asking price, this was a historic acquisition. It was the first piece of contemporary art created by an Indigenous artist bought by the National Gallery.

== The Columbus Project ==
The subject matter of his work turned toward the rapidly approaching 500th anniversary in 1992 of Christopher Columbus, and his arrival in North America. He found in this event, a source for a discussion on the nature of culture, as well as revisions and versions of history. He created at this time (1989–1992) a body of work entitled The Columbus Project. Its first stage had exhibition venues in Peterborough, Ontario at both ArtSpace (curated by Shelagh Young), and also the Art Gallery of Peterborough. The second phase of the Columbus Project was an exhibition at The Power Plant in Toronto, curated by Richard Rhodes entitled the Columbus Boat. The exhibition continued on to venues in Italy and the United States. Beam's imagery for the Columbus Project was cross-culturally vast, and contained the primary images of Columbus, and Native peoples, but also images of Martin Luther King Jr., John F. Kennedy, Albert Einstein, and Abraham Lincoln, Italian Christian iconography, diverse animal species, self-portraits and technology (stop lights, rockets). There were two sculptural elements, Voyage a partial reconstruction of the Santa Maria, and the Ampulleta, a 6-foot-tall (1.8 m) hourglass, with one obstructive stone within the sand, as well as several installations, and a video performance of Beam in the Dominican Republic, making a representational graveyard on the beaches where the landing could have taken place.

In 1992, Carl Beam and Ann Beam built an adobe house on Manitoulin Island. "Their adobe house became to a certain extent, a large-scale project which evolved naturally out of their earlier experiences with Native American pottery and the building vernacular of the American southwest." Their life experience was incorporated in his exhibition Living in Mother Earth, and her exhibition Sub-division Suite/Earth Builder's Narrative.

== The Whale of Our Being ==
Beam entered the new millennium with the body of work entitled The Whale of Our Being, in this work, "Beam examines the calamitous moral fallout from what he perceives as a profound spiritual absence in contemporary society, symbolized by a great whale of primordial proportions". The exhibition, featuring large photo emulsion works on canvas, constructions, large-scale paper works, and ceramics, titled Carl Beam: The Whale of Our Being, was curated by Joan Murray for the Robert McLaughlin Gallery, in Oshawa in 2002. Murray wrote of the way Beam's imagery had become vast and all-inclusive:

"Compared to earlier work, The Whale of Our Being exhibits a positively baroque complexity, a dizzying assortment of references, sometimes printed in overly saturated, fluorescent colour. Mystery, for instance, is pink-Day-Glo-coloured pink. The colour in Summa ranges from Day-Glo yellow-green to orange; the images from Einstein and the Hubble Telescope, and astronaut, and Sitting Bull to and image of the First Nations, and more besides."

Allan J. Ryan said of this period of Beam's work, "He re-examines the media construction of violence and infamy and the public fascination with celebrity". Said Beam at a panel discussion for the Beyond History exhibition in 1989, "If an artist has a legitimate premise, there is nothing which isn't within their field of enquiry".

== Crossroads ==
His last body of work was in process until the time of his death in 2005. It was titled Crossroads from the blues song by Robert Johnson. The work included images of pop stars, gangsters, scientists, native leaders, politicians, writers and poets, musicians (Robert Johnson, Bob Dylan, Marilyn Manson, Jerry Garcia, Britney Spears, John Lennon), TV personalities (Martha Stewart), animals, and birds. He had completed Plexiglas works, and 22"x 30" paper works for Crossroads and was in the middle of a suite of etchings at the time of his death.

== It's All Relative exhibition ==
In 2004, the Canadian Clay and Glass Gallery in Waterloo, Ontario, created a traveling exhibition, curated by Virginia Eichhorn, of 50 ceramic pieces by Carl Beam, Ann Beam, and Anong Migwans Beam. This marked the first time all three exhibited together. It was his last exhibition during his lifetime and was a touring exhibition.

== Legacy ==
Carl Beam was the first artist of Indigenous ancestry to have his work purchased by the National Gallery of Canada as contemporary art (1986), thus opening the door for a generation of Indigenous artists to enter. "Despite Beam's reluctance to be defined as a "Native Artist", his art deals with the struggles of his people."

Beam brought an innovative approach to all the media he worked in. "Technically Beam is regarded as an innovator for his intentional blurring of diverse art practices, thereby enabling certain methodologies and techniques to acquire new contexts. His innovative techniques, in fact, have been emulated by a new generation of artists-Native and not." "He evolved his own unique techniques as needed in photo-etching and photo based painting, to name a few, and his passionate discourse on all things political and practical inspired many people."

A major retrospective of his work, mounted by the National Gallery of Canada, was placed on exhibition starting October 22, 2010, thus recognizing Beam as one of Canada's important artists. The exhibition, curated by Greg A. Hill, Audain Curator and Head of the Department of Indigenous Art, was accompanied by a catalogue with essays by Ann Beam, Greg Hill, Gerald McMaster, Virginia Eichhorn, and Alan Corbiere with Crystal Migwans, including paintings, photo-based collage works, constructions, ceramics and videos.

On May 24, 2020 – the 77th anniversary of his birthday – the Art Canada Institute posted that it will be publishing a book on Beam, written by his daughter, Anong Migwans Beam. The Art Canada Institute published the book, Carl Beam: Life & Work, in 2024. It explores the artist's biography, key works, style, and legacy.

== Awards and honours ==
- In 2000 Beam was inducted into the Royal Canadian Academy of Arts
- Beam received the Governor General's Award in Visual and Media Arts in 2005.
