= Mantario Trail =

Coordinates: 49.985°N 95.154°W

The Mantario Trail is a multipurpose trail in southeastern Manitoba. It is 64 kilometers long and meanders through rugged Canadian Shield. The trail is predominantly located within Whiteshell Provincial Park, although a very small portion of it enters Crown Land in Ontario. It is named after Mantario Lake, where one of several campsites that are along the trail sits. A large portion of the Mantario Trail is in a Wilderness Zone which is an area protected from motorized access and hunting.

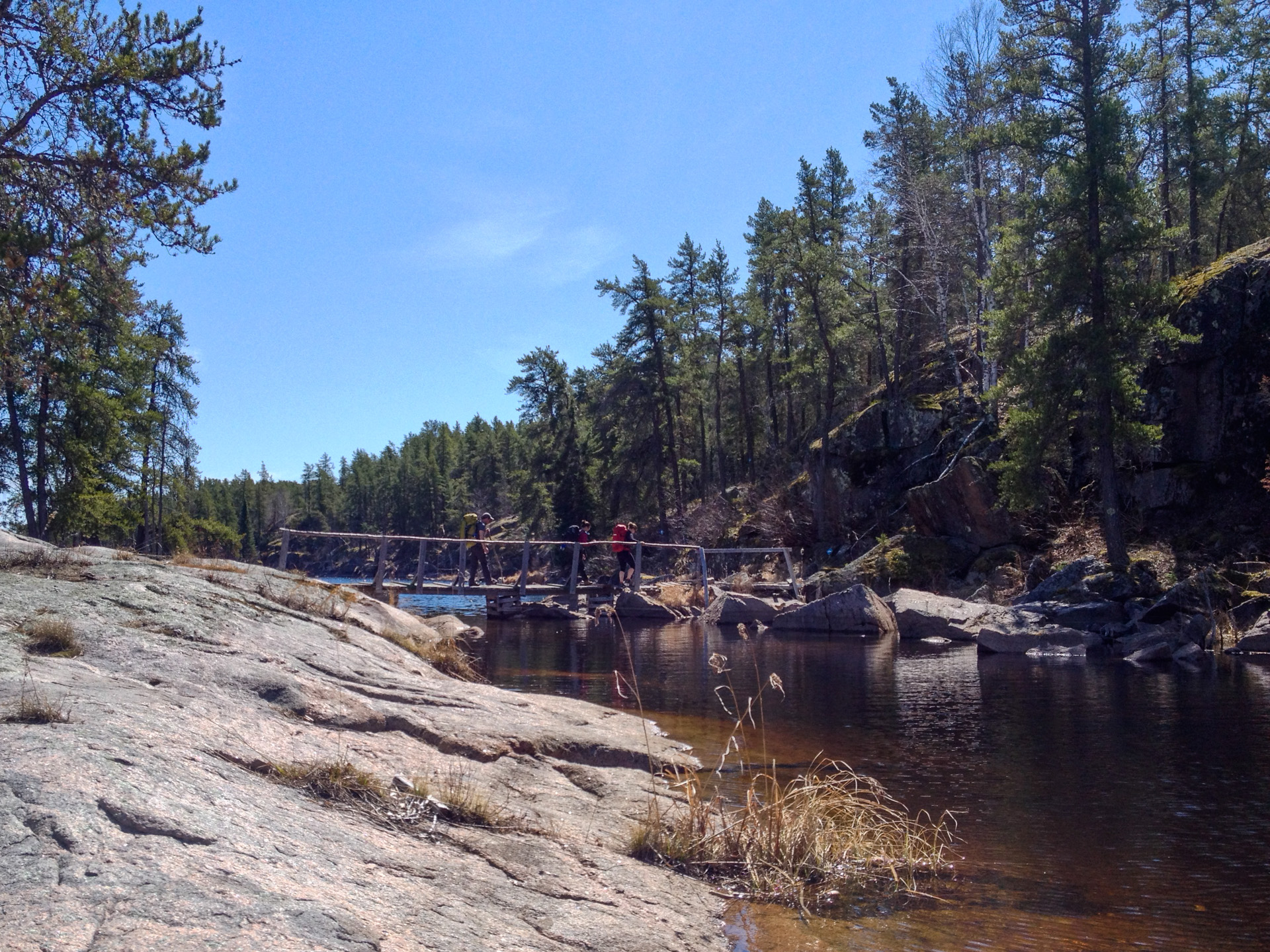
Bridge crossing at Olive Lake

== Hiking the Trail ==
This is a trail designed for experienced and well-prepared backpackers. An average hiker can usually complete the trail in 3 or 4 days. Water, particularly spring thaw and recent rainfall, can significantly affect many areas of the trail. Wind damage, wildfire, and flood have led to sections of the trail being closed in 2013, 2016, and 2025. Cellular phone service is unreliable and is usually limited to open rock faces at higher altitudes when available. Middle sections of the trail can be accessed by canoe (and portages), but there are no roads that access the trail other than at the trailheads.

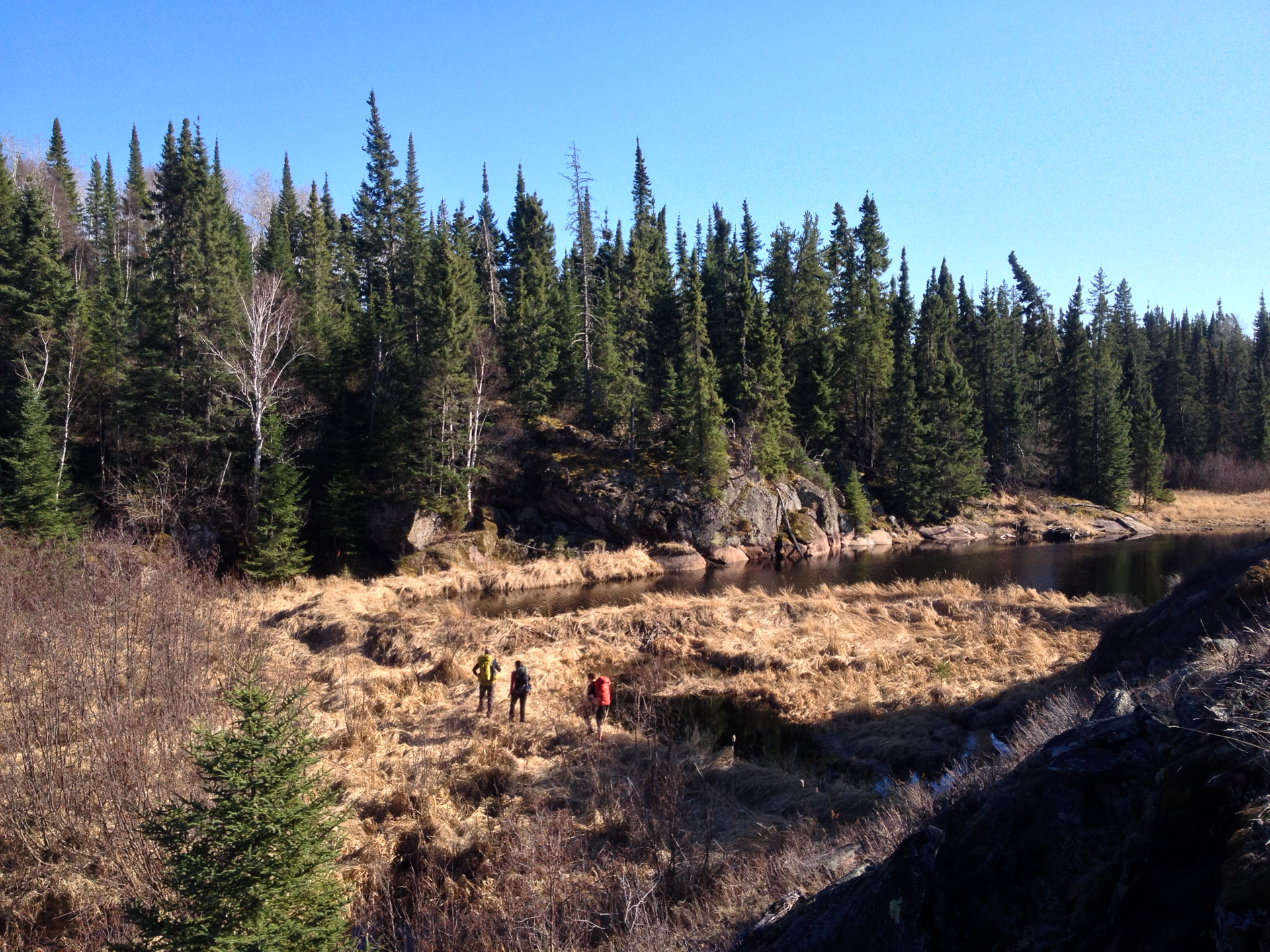
Beaver dam crossing.

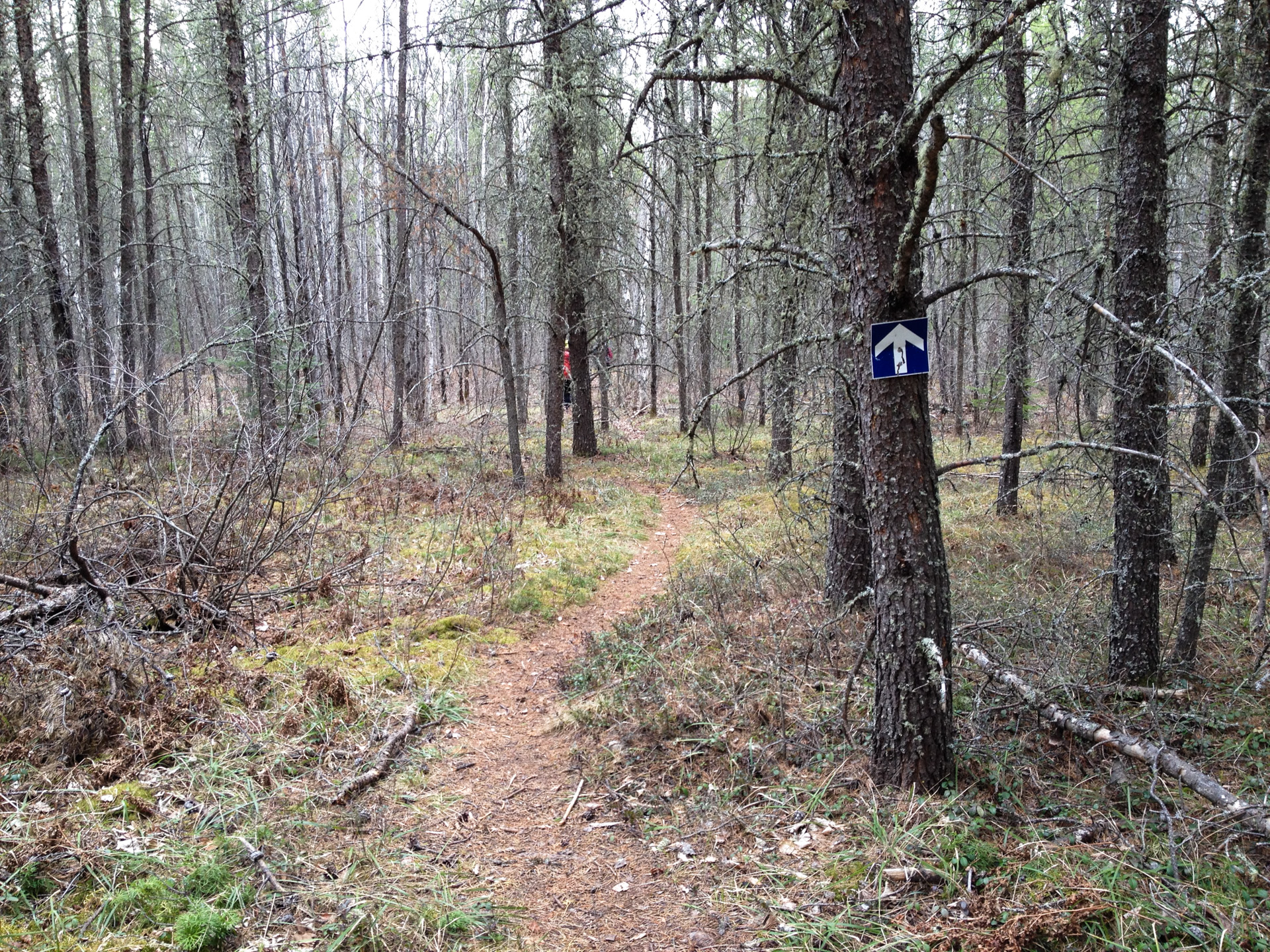
Well worn trail and trail marker.

The south trailhead is north of Westhawk Lake and just to the east of Caddy Lake. The north trailhead is on the north side of Big Whiteshell Lake. There is parking available at both trailheads, although the lot at the south trailhead is considerably larger. As of yet there are no businesses that offer shuttle service between trailheads. Waterproof and tearproof maps are available from several sources, including Manitoba Conservation. There are organizations that offer guided hiking trips on the Mantario Trail, if needed.

== Trail Maintenance ==
The Manitoba Naturalists Society (MNS) is a volunteer non-profit organization that has stewarded Mantario trail development and maintenance over the years. The MNS Outdoor Committee has leaders who offer minimal-cost trips on the trail.

== Mantario Cabin ==
Associated with the Mantario Trail is the Mantario Wilderness Cabin a facility located on an island on Mantario Lake and which is operated by Nature Manitoba. The Mantario Wilderness Education program is intended to offer remote wilderness education opportunities in numerous disciplines with reasonably priced 5-day programs through July and August. The cabin is accessed by non-motorized means such as canoeing and portaging, hiking, crosscountry skiing or snowshoeing. Various trips to the Mantario Cabin are organized by MNS Trip Leaders throughout the year.

== Events ==
Since 1980, a group of local runners have been participating the annual Mantario Marathon. A two-day run that starts at the south trail head on day one. The end point for the day is the Wilderness Cabin. The second day then proceeds to the north trail head. The tradition has evolved that if you want to be considered the winner, you must sleep outside rather than in the cabin. The traditional date of the race is not disclosed to the general public, to discourage weekend warriors who are not capable of the self-sufficiency required.

Since 1990, the first three place finishers, who slept outside, are entitled to refer to themselves as "Gods of the trail".

Special status ("Honoured Gods" ) goes to those who have such exceptional pacing ability as to be able to win the race at precisely the same time (known as a "Mantario Tie").

Individuals have also had success completing the 63 kilometer trek in one or two days, by jogging or walking.
