= Whiteshell River =

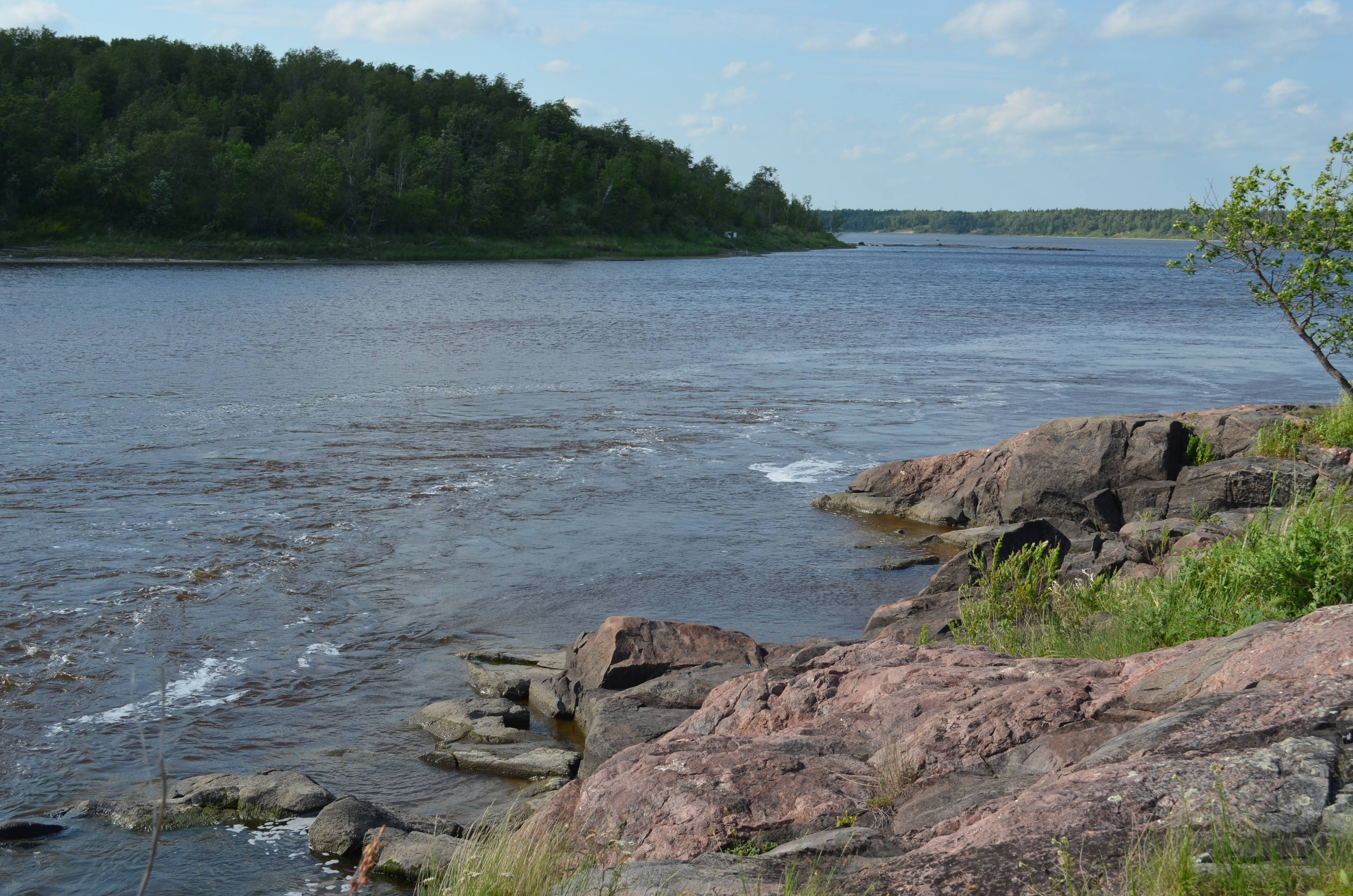

- river mouth

Location
- Provinces: Ontario, Manitoba

Physical characteristics
- Source: Engineer Lake
  - location: Ontario
  - coordinates: 49°43′20″N 94°55′41″W
  - elevation: 377 m (1,237 ft)
- Mouth: Nutimik Lake
  - location: Manitoba
  - coordinates: 50°08′59″N 95°39′52″W
  - elevation: 270 m (890 ft)

Basin features
- Progression: Winnipeg River→ Lake Winnipeg→ Nelson River→ Hudson Bay
- Tributaries
  - left: McGillivray Creek; Hansons Creek; Trail Creek; One Stone Creek; Rennie River; Fraser Creek
  - right: Longpine Creek; Gundy Creek; Nora Creek; North Cross Creek; Fisher Creek
- Waterbodies: Bwan Lake; Moth Lake; Royal Lake; West Hawk Lake; Caddy Lake; South Cross Lake; North Cross Lake; Sailing Lake; Mallard Lake; Lone Island Lake; Jessica Lake; White Lake; Betula Lake

The Whiteshell River is one of the major rivers in Whiteshell Provincial Park, in southeastern Manitoba, Canada, near the Ontario border. This river is close to some petroform sites that are about 2000 years old or older. The name "whiteshell" is in reference to the Meegis or cowry shells used by Ojibwa peoples in their ceremonies and teachings, especially the Midewiwin, and as recorded in their birch bark scrolls.

The river was used for thousands of years as a major canoe route by native peoples. The Winnipeg and Whiteshell Rivers are the only waterways to easily travel between Lake Winnipeg and Lake Superior. The copper culture period of about 4,000 years ago involved the trade of copper from the north shore of Lake Superior to the Whiteshell Provincial Park area and other areas now known as Manitoba and northwestern Ontario. Manitoba also has prehistoric quartz mines to the far north, and evidence of ancient quartz mining also exists along the Winnipeg River area. Quartz, copper, and other minerals were used to make prehistoric arrow heads, tools, scrapers, spears, and artwork.

Whiteshell Provincial Park is still a popular area for wild rice harvesting, as it was for thousands of years. Today this river system area is popular for canoeing, hiking, swimming, fishing, boating, and many cottages are located along the lakes and rivers of the park.

The geography and geology of the area consists of Canadian Shield granite rock ridges, cliffs, boreal forest, bogs, and only one main road through the park. It is a very wild and pristine area with many deer, bear, wolves, coyotes, bald eagles, fox, cougars, lynx, and other wildlife.

== Fish ==
Fish habitat in the river includes short areas of fast flowing water with rapids and small waterfalls, shallow and deep water lakes and slow flowing meanders through bogs. The clear water supports beds of underwater vegetation. 61 of the 79 native fish species found in Manitoba are recorded from the Winnipeg River drainage basin of which the Whiteshell River is a part. Betula Lake, Jessica Lake, and Lone Island Lake are important traditional fishing areas for Manitoba First Nations peoples. A marine glacial relict, the Deepwater sculpin is found in West Hawk Lake. The river and its lakes are popular with recreational anglers. More than 650 Master Angler awards have been made for documented trophy catches in the Whiteshell River including Black crappie, Brown trout (introduced), Bullhead, Goldeye, Lake sturgeon, Mooneye, Northern pike, Rainbow trout (introduced), Rock bass, Sauger, Smallmouth bass, Walleye, and Yellow perch.

== Bannock Point ==
Bannock Point is a rock ridge overlooking the place where the Rennie River flows into the Whiteshell River a short distance upstream from the place where the Whiteshell flows into the Winnipeg River. A plaque installed in 1959 near PR 307 marks the significance of the boulder mosaics or petroforms near this location.

== Gallery ==
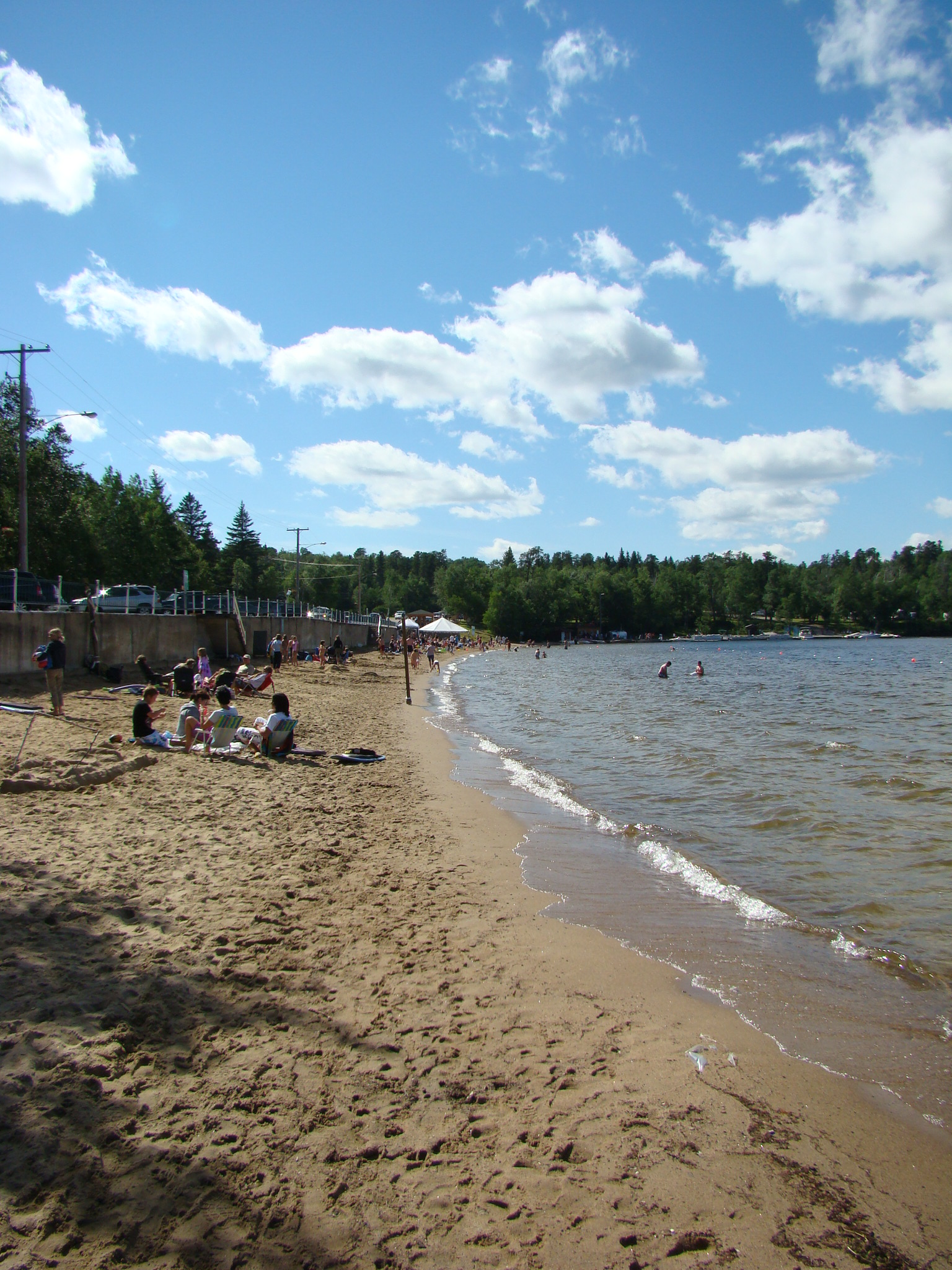
West Hawk Lake Beachfront

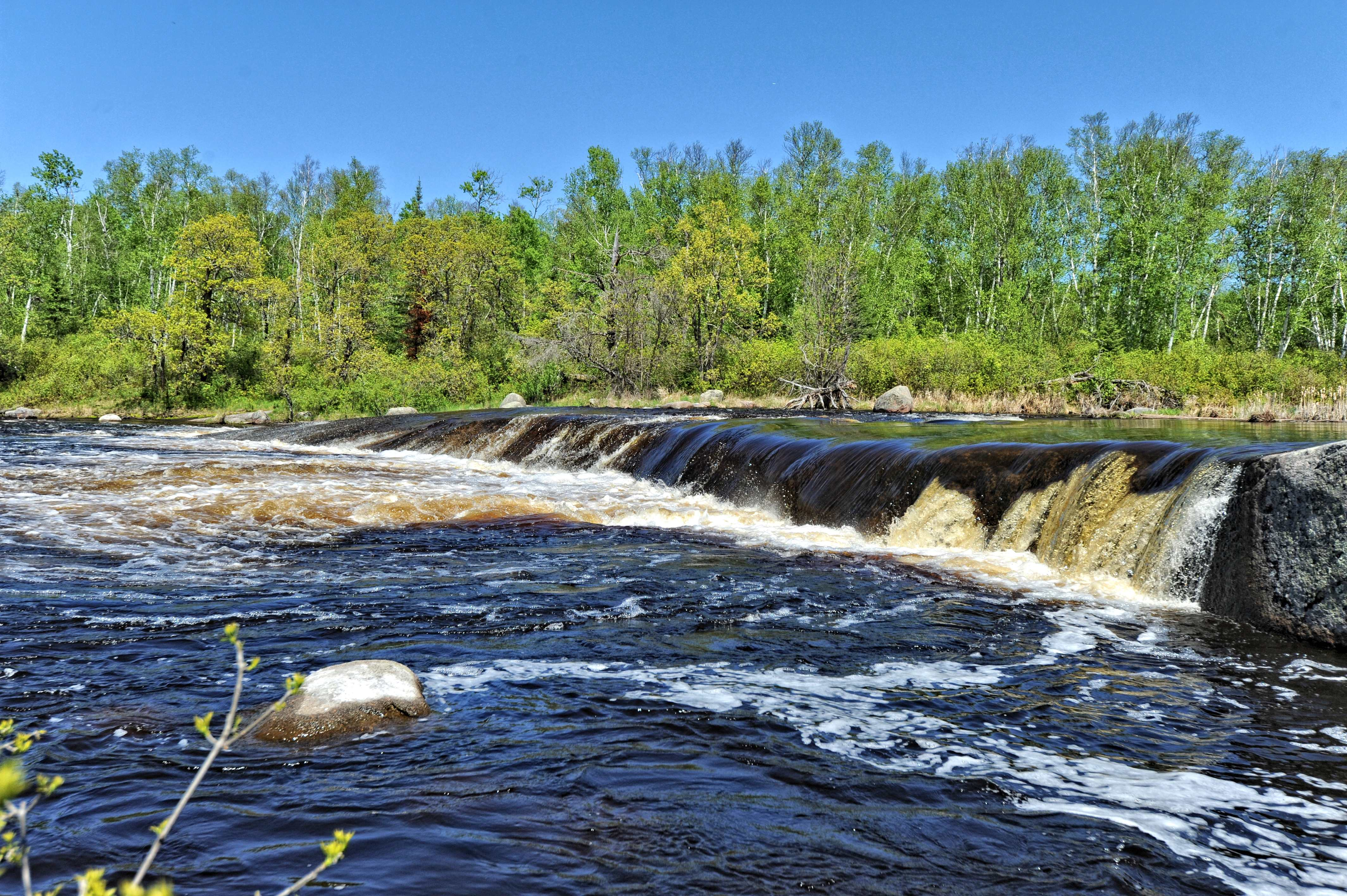
Rainbow Falls upstream of White Lake

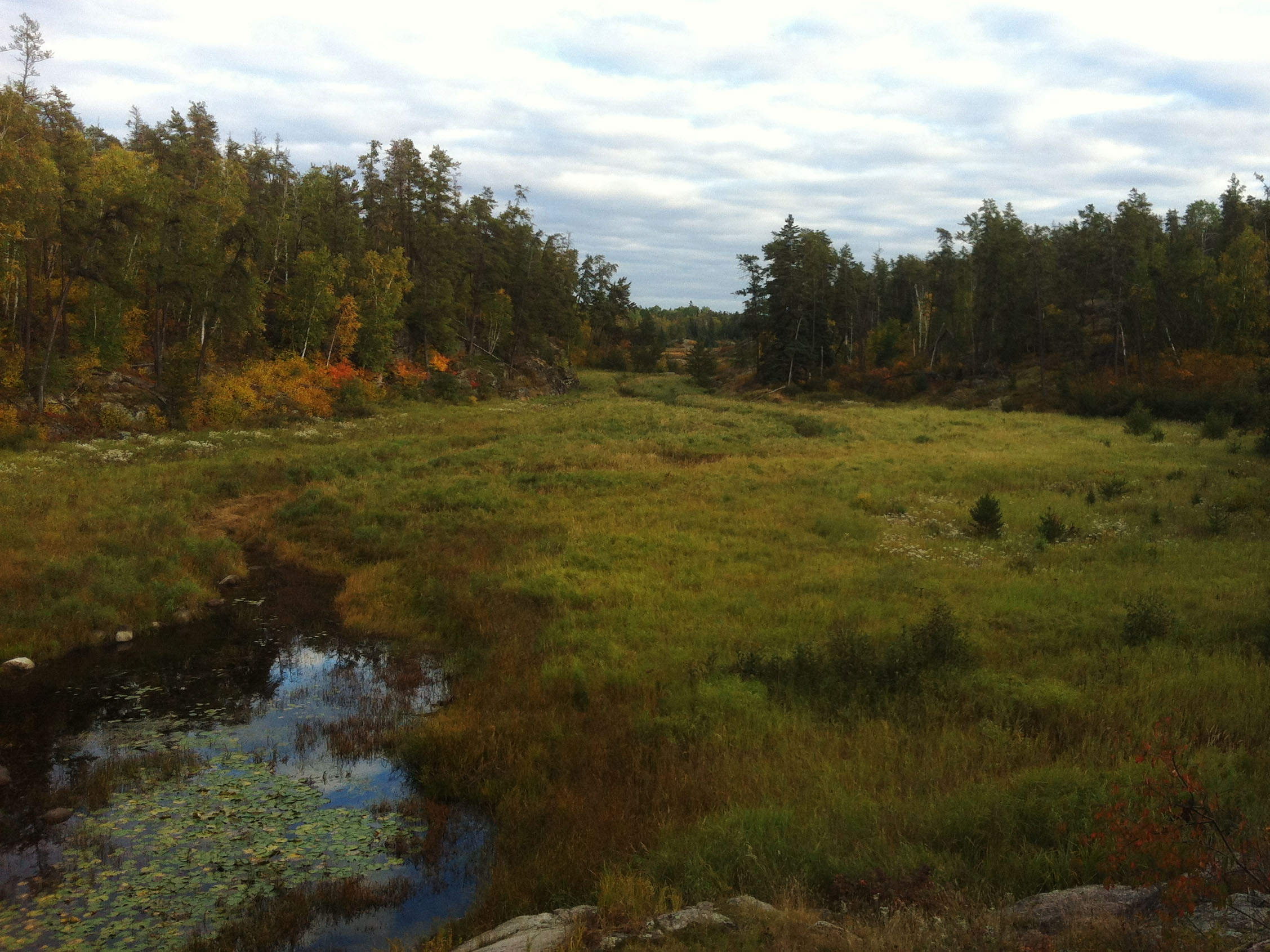
McGillivray Creek in the autumn

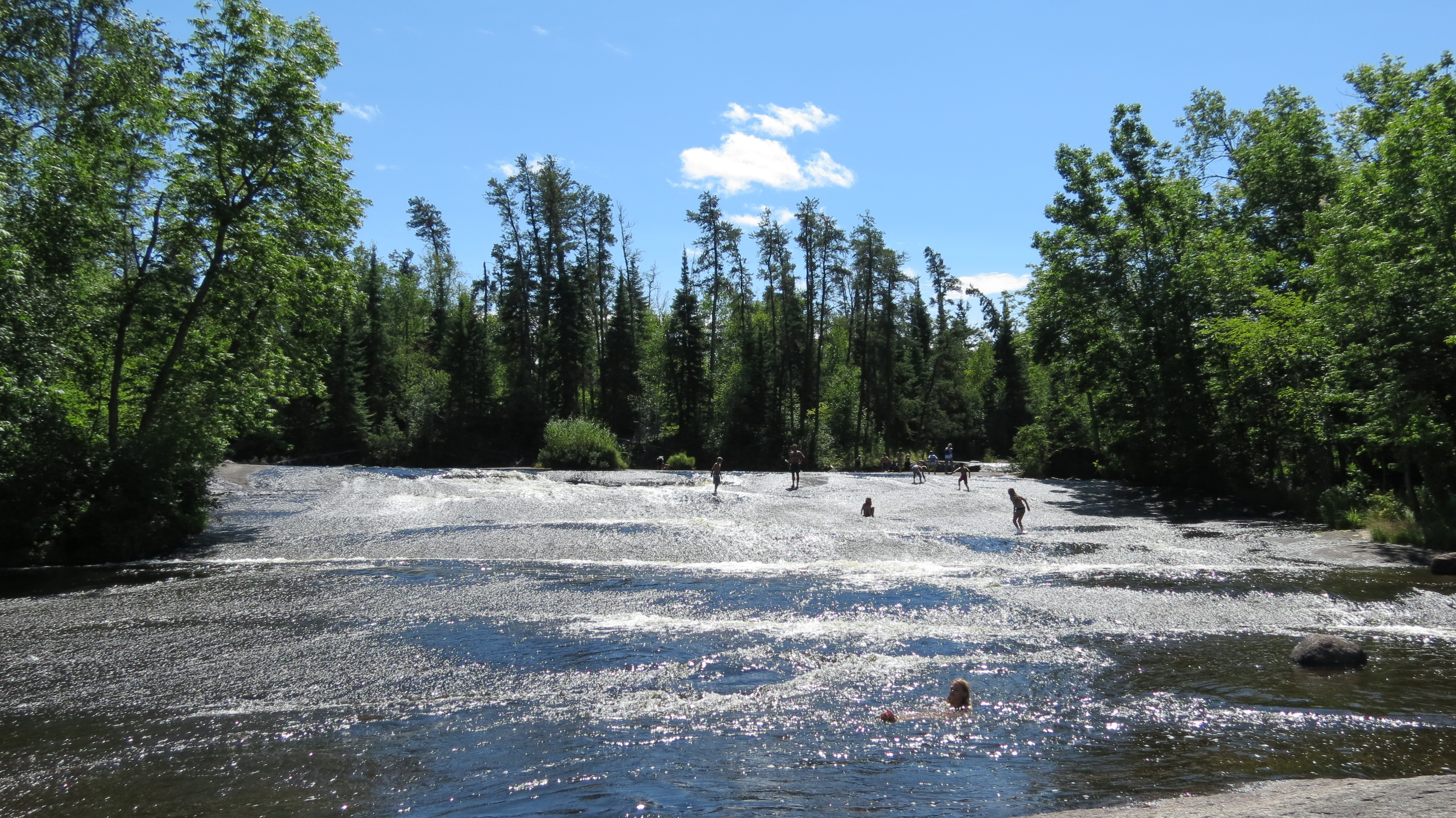
Pine Point Rapids downstream of Betula Lake

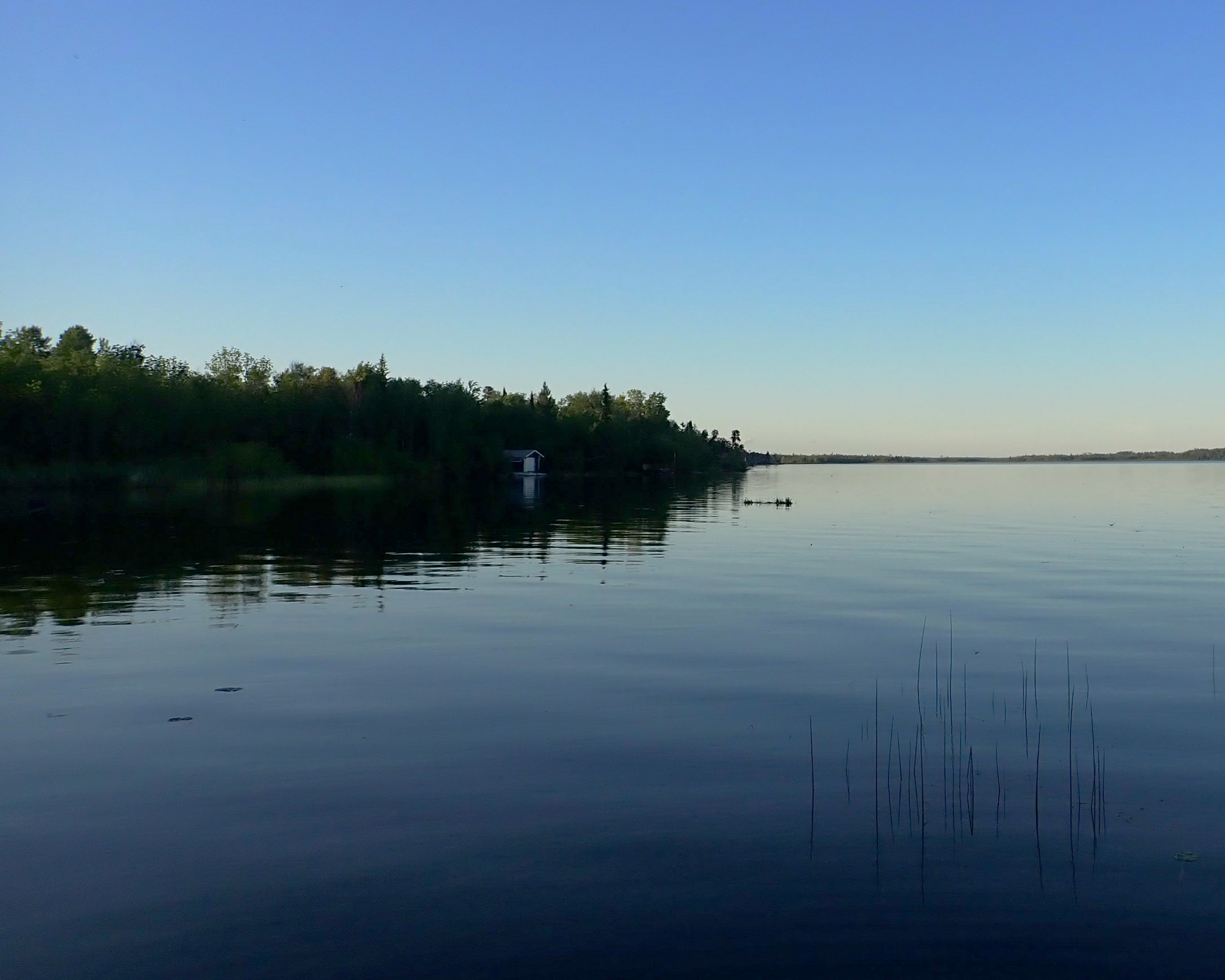
Jessica Lake just before sunset

== See also ==
- List of Ontario rivers
- List of Manitoba rivers
