= Caddy Lake =

Lake in Manitoba, Canada

- Location of lake in Manitoba, Canada Caddy Lake (Canada)
- Location: Whiteshell Provincial Park, Manitoba
- Coordinates: 49°48′48″N 95°12′34″W
- Type: glacial
- Part of: Nelson River Drainage Basin
- Primary inflows: Whiteshell River
- River sources: McGillivray Creek
- Primary outflows: Whiteshell River
- Basin countries: Canada
- Surface area: 300 ha (740 acres)
- Max. depth: 5.7 m (19 ft)
- Water volume: .026 km^{3} (0.0062 cu mi)
- Residence time: 1.15
- Shore length^{1}: 16.04 kilometres (9.97 mi)
- Surface elevation: 316 metres (1,037 ft)
- Islands: Boutilier Island
- ^{1} Shore length is not a well-defined measure.

Caddy Lake is a lake on the Whiteshell River in south-eastern Manitoba, Canada near the Manitoba–Ontario border. McGillivray Creek drains into the lake on its west side. It is within Whiteshell Provincial Park near West Hawk Lake. The lake has a surface area of about 300 hectares (740 acres) and a maximum depth of 5.7 metres (19 ft).

Fishing is a popular sport on the lake yielding master angler catches of northern pike, walleye, smallmouth bass, white sucker, black crappie, rock bass, and yellow perch.

The lake was named in 1925 after J.S. Caddy, a CPR construction engineer.

The main CPR line passes to the north of the lake. A tunnel underneath the line was created to restore the drainage of the lake north into South Cross Lake blocked by the construction of the railway. This tunnel and another between North Cross and South Cross Lake under the CN rail line are popular tourist destinations.

The province operates seasonal Caddy Lake Campground on the western side of the lake. Several cottage subdivisions surround the lake.

Green Bay is located at 49° 48′ 42″ N, 95° 11′ 45″ W on the southeast quadrant of the lake. Green Bay Resort and Campground are located on the east shore of Caddy Lake. Caddy Lake Girl Guide Camp, founded in 1949 is located on the north side of Green Bay.

Boutilier Island is located at 49° 48′ 59″ N, 95° 12′ 54″ W in the northern half of the lake. It was named in 1985 after David Ainslie Boutilier, a former RCMP officer and owner of Green Bay Resort.

== See also ==
- List of lakes of Manitoba
