= Whiteshell Provincial Park =

Provincial park in Manitoba, Canada

- IUCN category II (national park)
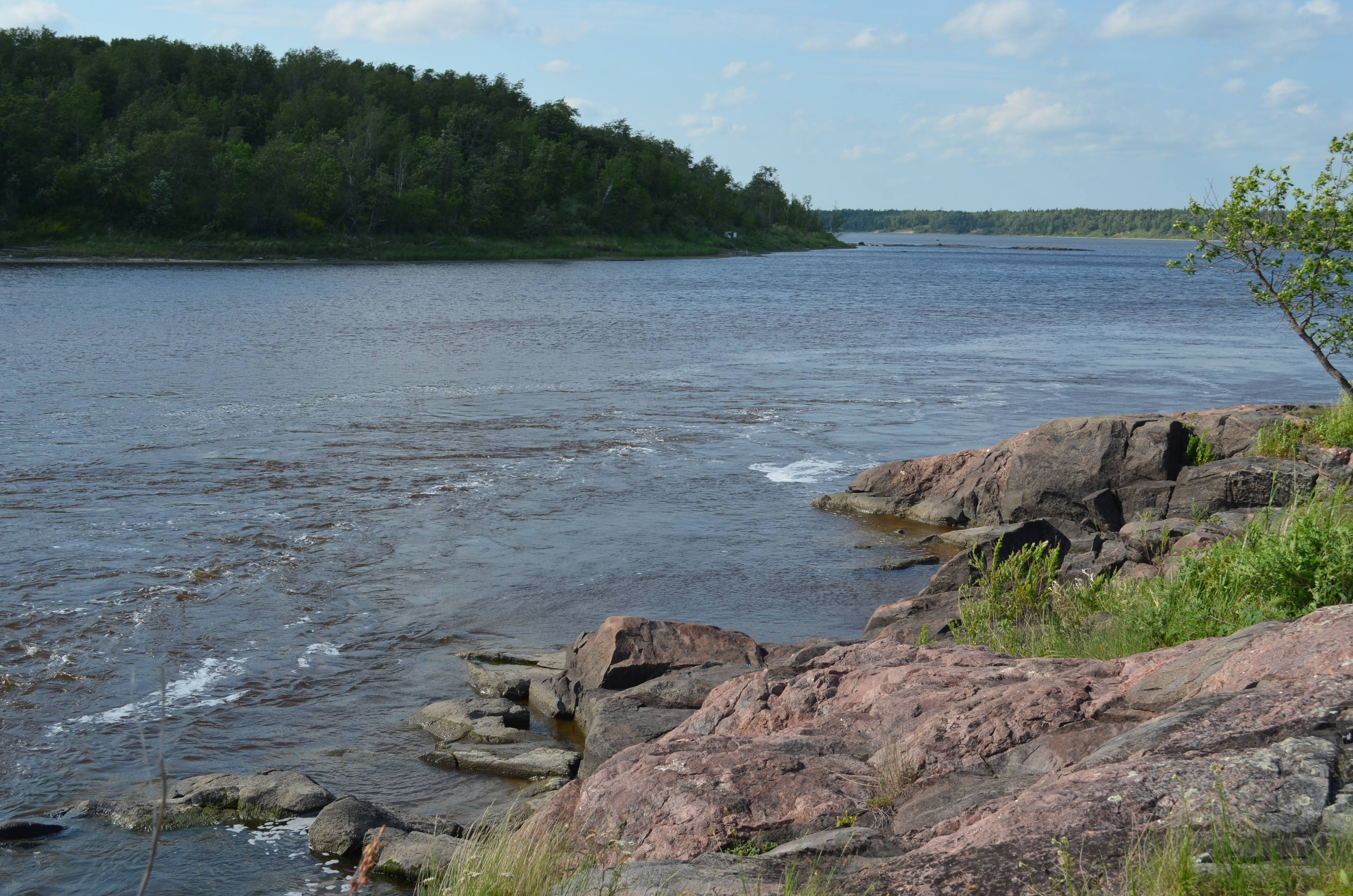
- Whiteshell river within the park

- Location within Manitoba
- Interactive map of Whiteshell Provincial Park
- Location: Manitoba, Canada
- Nearest city: Winnipeg, Manitoba
- Coordinates: 50°1′0″N 95°29′0″W
- Area: 2,721 km^{2} (1,051 sq mi)
- Established: 1961
- Governing body: Government of Manitoba

Whiteshell Provincial Park is a provincial park in southeast Manitoba, approximately 120 kilometres (75 mi) east of the city of Winnipeg. The park is considered to be a Class II protected area under the IUCN protected area management categories. It is 275,210 hectares (680,100 acres) in size.

The park protects areas representative of the Lake of the Woods Ecoregion within the Boreal Shield ecozone. The park's protection also specifically extends to the Tie Creek basin, an area of great spiritual significance to Indigenous peoples.

== History ==
Whiteshell Provincial Park was designated a provincial park by the Government of Manitoba in 1961. It was one of the first group of parks established the year following the passage of the Manitoba Provincial Parks Act. Tourism interest in the area had begun shortly after the arrival of railway lines—the Canadian Pacific Railway in 1883 and the Canadian Northern Railway around 1908. In 1927, the area was suggested as the location for Manitoba's first national park, eventually losing out to a competing proposal for Riding Mountain National Park.

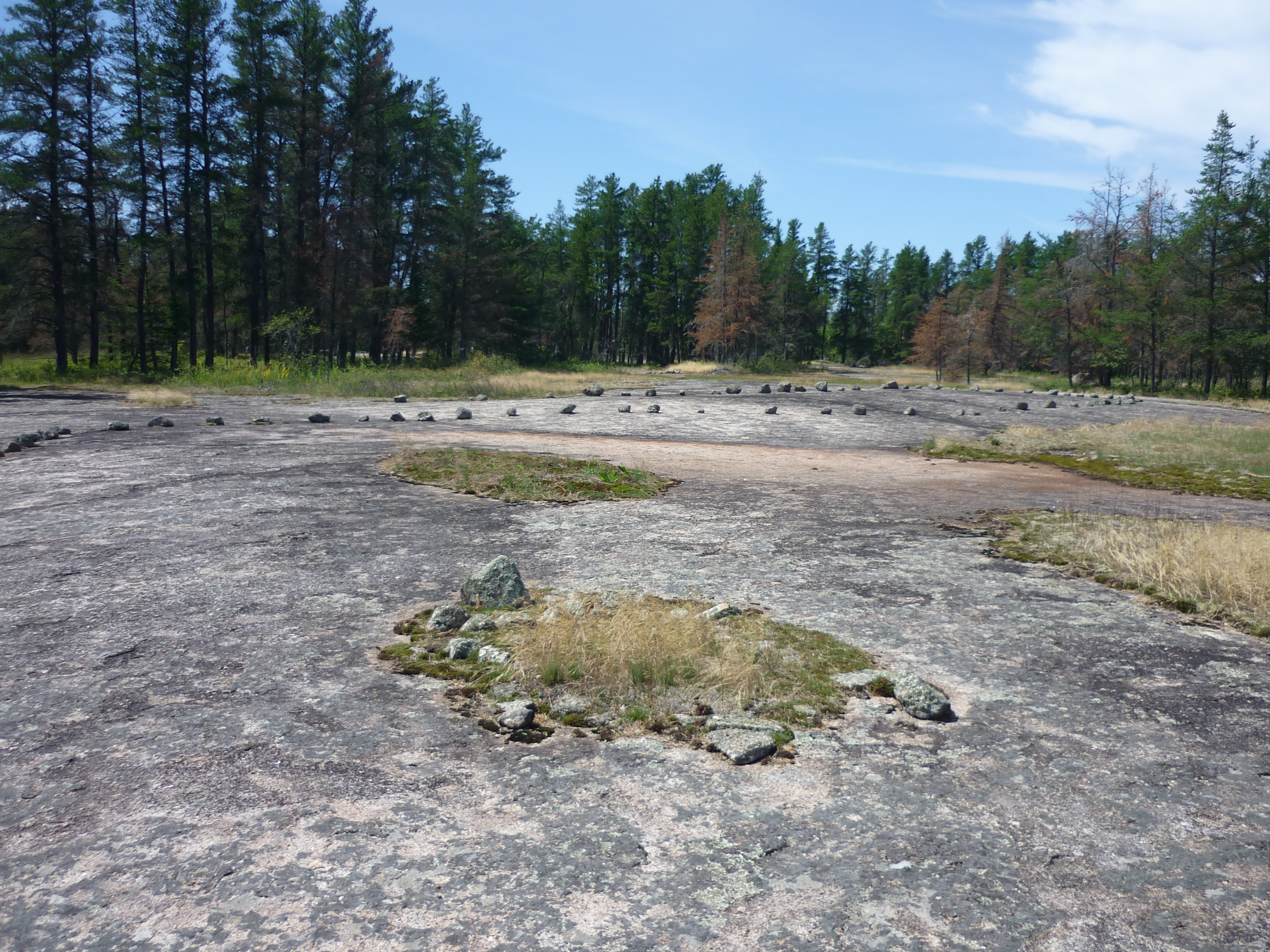
The Bannock Point petroform site

The Ojibway people and various other groups before them initially populated the area. The Ojibway, or Anishinaabe, first mapped some of the area on birch bark. The name of the park is derived from the cowrie shells that were used in ceremonies by the Anishinaabe, including the Ojibway, and among them the Midewiwin practitioners. The historic Winnipeg River and the Whiteshell River are the main rivers that run through the park. For thousands of years, Indigenous peoples used the area for harvesting wild rice, hunting, fishing, trade, ceremonies, teaching, and dwelling. In 1734, La Vérendrye was the first European to explore the area during his quest for a route to the Western Sea. First Nations, fur traders, and trappers used the Winnipeg River as the main travel route through this area, as well as the Whiteshell River.

Whiteshell Provincial Park has many pink granite ridges, cliffs, and flat granite areas used for petroform making by First Nation peoples. There is also archaeological evidence of ancient copper trading, prehistoric quartz mining, and stone tool making in the area. The copper trade, which extended toward Lake Superior, began approximately 6,000 years ago. Many artifacts and prehistoric camps were discovered in Whiteshell Provincial Park and are protected under the Heritage Act of Manitoba. The park is still used by Indigenous peoples for wild rice harvesting and ceremonies.

Around 1920, the development of roads brought tourists into the Whiteshell area. The first summer cottages were close to the Canadian Pacific Railway and the Canadian National Railway. In 1922 Brereton Lake Dominion Park was created. A decade later and in 1930 the park was transferred to the province of Manitoba and established the Whiteshell Forest Reserve. Further roadwork continued, linking the reserve to Ontario in the east and campgrounds and picnic sites further north.

A Manitoba Historical Plaque was erected in the community of Falcon Lake by the province to commemorate the role of the Dawson Road in Manitoba's heritage.

== Geography ==
Three rivers flow through the park forming strings of lakes. The Winnipeg River defines the northern edge of the park from Eaglenest Lake, straddling the Manitoba-Ontario boundary flowing west through Numao Lake, Nutimik Lake, Dorothy Lake, Margaret Lake to Natalie Lake on the park's northwestern edge. The Whiteshell River enters in the south-eastern corner linking West Hawk Lake, Caddy Lake, South Cross Lake, North Cross Lake, Sailing Lake, Mallard Lake, Lone Island Lake, Jessica Lake, White Lake and Betula Lake before joining the Winnipeg River at Nutimik Lake. The Rennie River forms a third chain of lakes, arising in Shiaro Lake within the park through Jean Lake, Brereton Lake, Rice Lake, Heart Lake before joining the Whiteshell River just below Betula Lake. Falcon Lake lies to the south of the TransCanada Highway. Big Whiteshell Lake is the largest of a number of lakes lying to the north of the Whiteshell River.

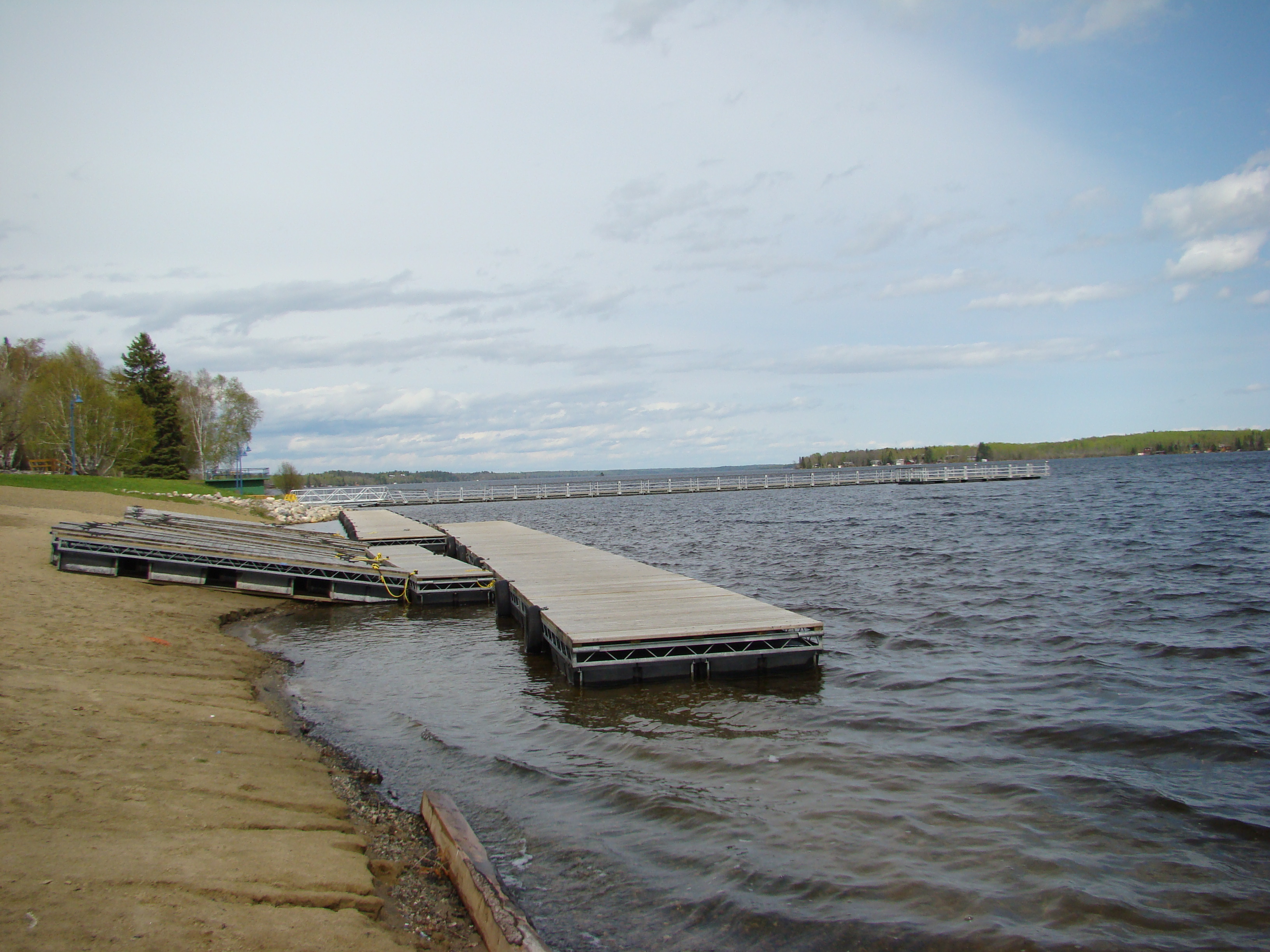
Piers at Falcon Lake

== Visiting the Park ==
The park is located along the eastern side of Southern Manitoba, along the Ontario border. It is the first area that is entered when arriving in Manitoba from the east on the Trans-Canada Highway which runs east west through the park. Provincial Trunk Highway 44 joins West Hawk Lake with Rennie. Provincial Road 309 connects Provincial Road 307 at White Lake with Lone Island Lake and Big Whiteshell Lake.

Park vehicle permits are typically required year-round in Manitoba Provincial Parks. Permits are available at all campgrounds and district offices, or can be purchased online.

The population in the park increases significantly in the summer. Many of these seasonal residents own cottages or cabins built on land leased from the Crown. The word 'cottaging' is used to describe staying at these seasonal residences. Visitors to the park who are not interested in camping can choose to rent a cottage or cabin or stay in a lodge or resort.

The Province operates ten serviced campgrounds in the park May through October. Reservations for these sites must be made through the Manitoba Parks Reservation Service. Fees vary depending on facilities and services provided.

=== Summer ===
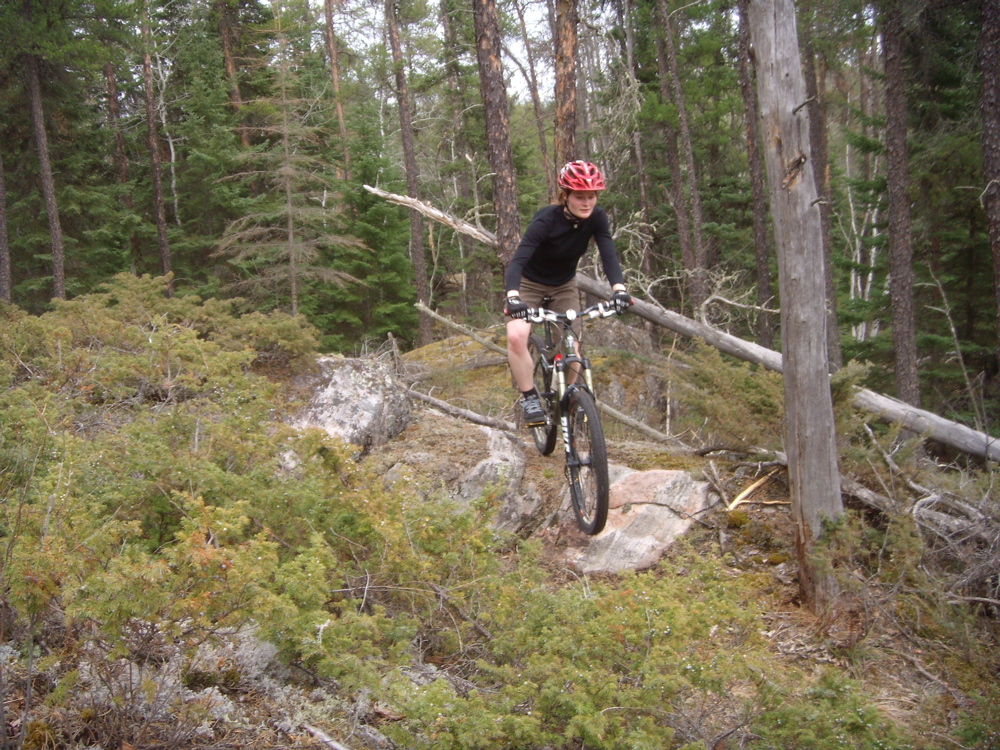
Mountain biking

- Boating – Boat launches are accessible at a variety of lakes and many resorts offer boat rentals.
- Canoeing and kayaking – Up to 325 km of canoe routes are located within the park. Paddlers on the Caddy Lake Canoe Route pass through tunnels in a wall of rock that were created when the railways came through this area more than a century ago.
- Sailing and boardsailing – Falcon Lake and West Hawk Lake maintain sailing clubs.
- Fishing – There are a dozen species of fish that will provide fishing enjoyment.
- Swimming – Numerous public beaches permit swimming and many lakeside cottages allow swimming at the shoreline area.
- Hiking – Trails range from short 1.5 km routes to the more challenging 60 km Mantario Trail, connecting Caddy Lake with Block 2 of Big Whiteshell Lake. Part of the Trans-Canada Trail is contained in the park, although construction is incomplete.
- Cycling – A 4.2 km loop is available at Betula Lake on Provincial Road 307 and a 9 km trail at Big Whiteshell Lake on Provincial Road 309. The South Whiteshell Trail is a multi-use trail system that accommodates cyclists. The trail connects Falcon Lake to Caddy Lake and will be approximately 29 kilometres in length.

=== Winter ===
- Icefishing
- Snowmobiling – Over 200 km of marked and groomed snowmobiling trails offer winter recreation.
- Snowshoeing – In winter, this snow allows for snowshoeing on the trail systems and on the frozen lakes.

== North Whiteshell ==
The northern portion of the park may be accessed by road from the west via PR 307 at Seven Sisters Falls or Highway 44 at Rennie. Pointe du Bois can be reached by road via PR 313. Furthermore, Via Rail's Canadian serves the park at Brereton Lake, Ophir, and Winnitoba stations.

Stations in North Whiteshell
- Current services at Brereton Lake
  Preceding station	Via Rail	Following station
  Elma toward Vancouver	The Canadian	Ophir toward Toronto
  Former services at Brereton Lake
  Preceding station	Canadian National Railway	Following station
  Indigo toward Vancouver	Main Line	Decimal toward Montreal
  Current services at Ophir
  Preceding station	Via Rail	Following station
  Brereton Lake toward Vancouver	The Canadian	Winnitoba toward Toronto
  Former services at Ophir
  Preceding station	Canadian National Railway	Following station
  Decimal toward Vancouver	Main Line	Winnitoba toward Montreal

Provincial campgrounds located in the North Whiteshell are Otter Falls, Nutimik Lake, Betula Lake, White Lake, Big Whiteshell Lake and Brereton Lake.

=== Whiteshell Natural History Museum ===
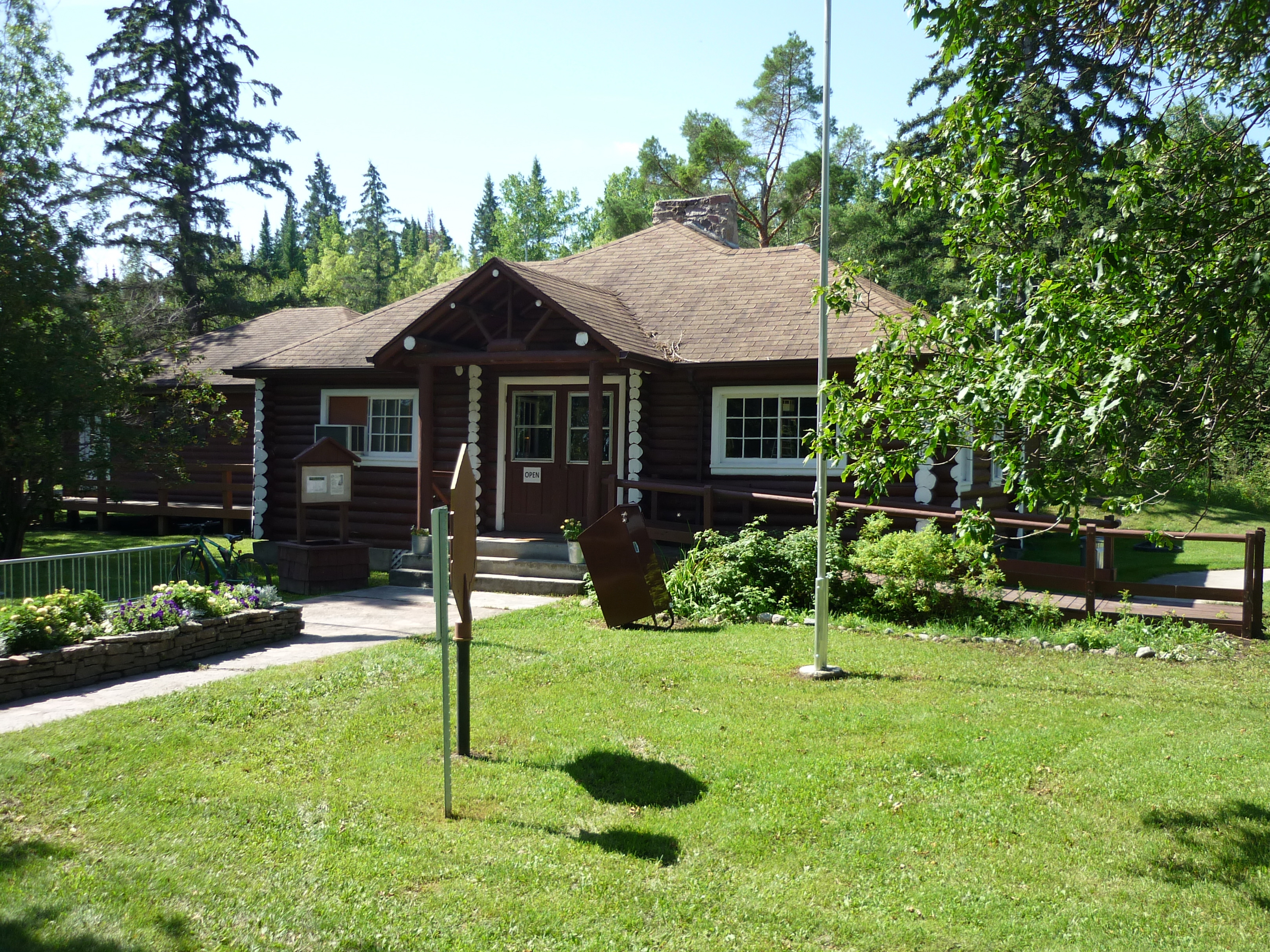
The Whiteshell Natural History Museum

The Whiteshell Natural History Museum, opened in 1960 and located in a log building, features mounted wildlife displays of local animals. Other displays include the boreal forest, Canadian Indigenous peoples, petroforms, sturgeon and the Winnipeg River. The museum is located on PR 307 at Nutimik Lake. It has been closed since 2018.

=== Alfred Hole Goose Sanctuary ===
The Alfred Hole Goose Sanctuary and Interpretive Centre is located at PTH 44, slightly east of Rennie. The sanctuary protects nesting Canada geese each spring. The interpretive centre provides information about the biology of the geese and the history of the sanctuary, as well as an observation gallery for the lake and interpretive programs.

=== Whiteshell Trappers Museum ===
The Whiteshell Trappers Museum is located on the grounds of the Alfred Hole Goose Sanctuary. Built in 1997, the museum resembles a fur trapper's cabin. Interpreters discuss the history of fur trapping, trapping techniques, and local wildlife.

== South Whiteshell ==
The park may be accessed from the south side via exits on the Trans-Canada Highway (Hwy 1), where visitors may enter near Falcon Lake on the western side or West Hawk Lake on the east. The main park entrance is located at Falcon Lake, immediately south of the Trans-Canada Highway. Falcon Lake has two provincially operated campgrounds, a beach, golf course, ski resort, riding stables and many other tourist services. It is the west end of Manitoba Provincial Road 301 which runs east through Faloma, Toniata, and Star Lake to the community of West Hawk Lake.

Provincial campgrounds in the southern portion of the park are Caddy Lake, Falcon Beach, Falcon Lakeshore and West Hawk Lake.

West Hawk Lake, the deepest lake in the province, was formed by a meteorite, and is a popular spot for scuba diving and ice diving.

=== West Hawk Museum ===
Located at West Hawk Lake, the West Hawk Museum features exhibits about the area's geology, area gold mining, and the formation of the lake from the impact of meteorite that formed the West Hawk crater.

=== Whiteshell Fish Hatchery Interpretive Centre ===
The Whiteshell Fish Hatchery Interpretive Centre offers tours in the summer months, allowing visitors to learn about the hatchery's current activities in raising trout and walleye, and historical activities with lake sturgeon. The hatchery is located along the Whiteshell River just north of West Hawk Lake. The fish in the hatchery are used to help stock lakes and rivers for sport fishing throughout Manitoba.

== Ecology ==
=== Fauna ===
Whiteshell Provincial Park is home to a variety of large mammals including black bear, moose, white-tailed deer, timber wolf and lynx. Smaller mammals such as river otter, marten, fisher, red fox, mink, hare, beaver, bats, skunk, raccoon, muskrat and red squirrels also inhabit the park. The birds in the park include owls, bald eagles, ruby throated hummingbirds, chickadees, blue jays, grosbeaks, turkey vultures, redpolls, woodpeckers, osprey, loons, ruffed grouse, ducks and Canada geese. Snakes, turtles and a wide variety of insects are found in the park. The lakes and rivers contain perch, walleye, jackfish, lake sturgeon, black crappie, burbot, whitefish, trout, white bass, smallmouth bass and mooneye. Smoked mooneye meat is highly valued and sold as "Winnipeg goldeye".

== Gallery ==
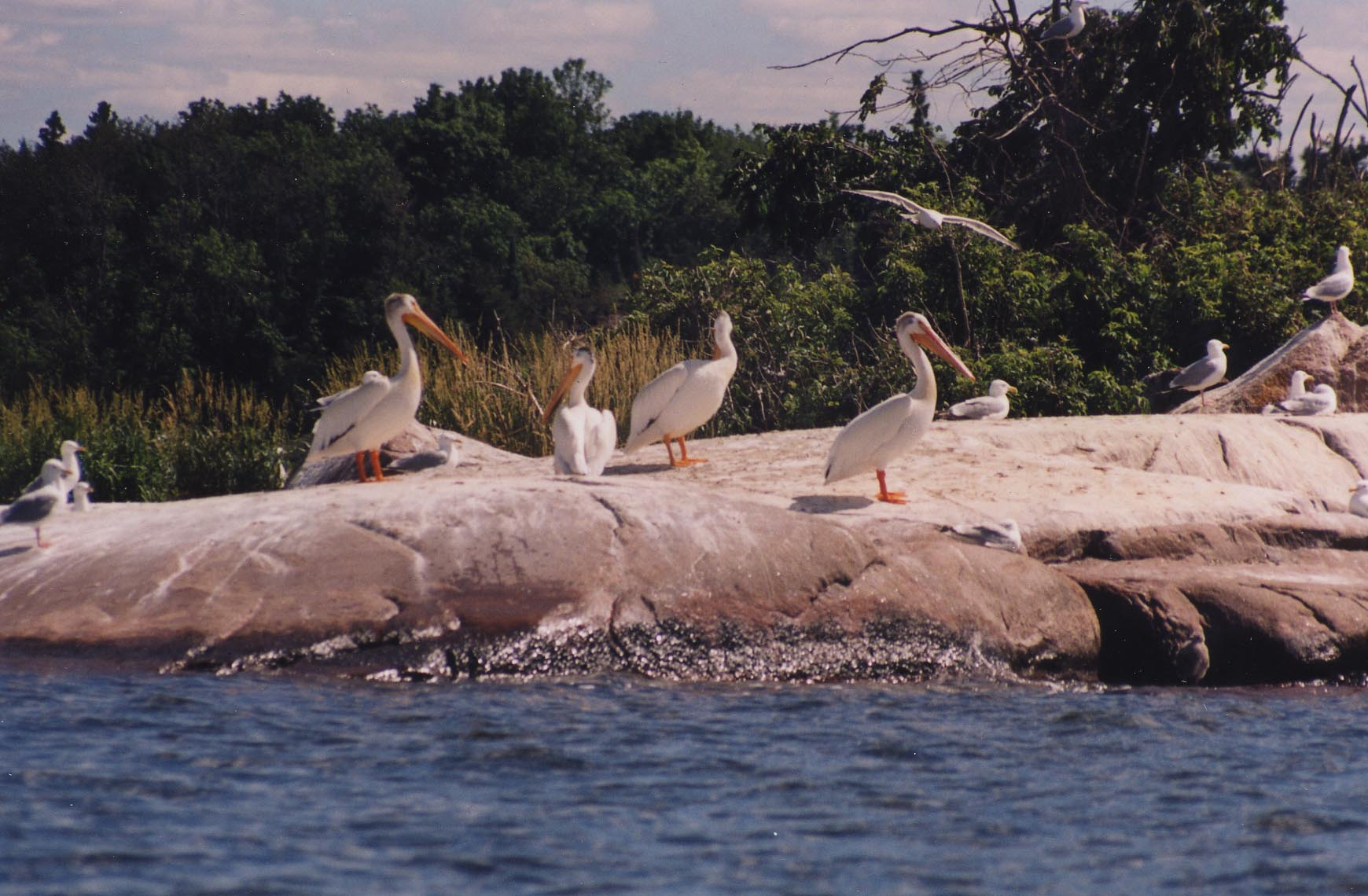
Pelicans on Big Whiteshell Lake

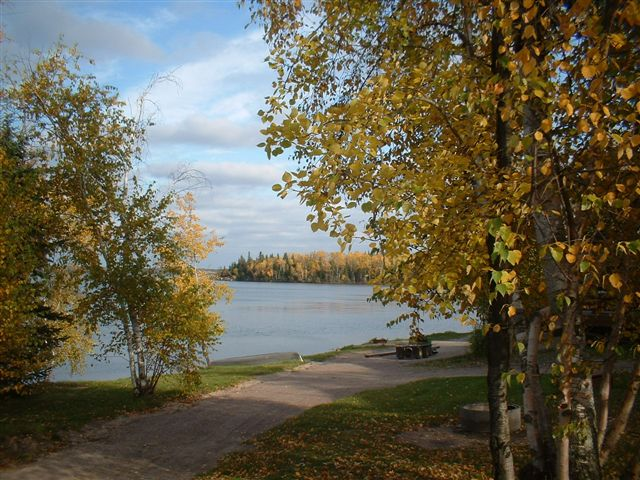
Big Whiteshell Lake in the Fall

Longpine Creek

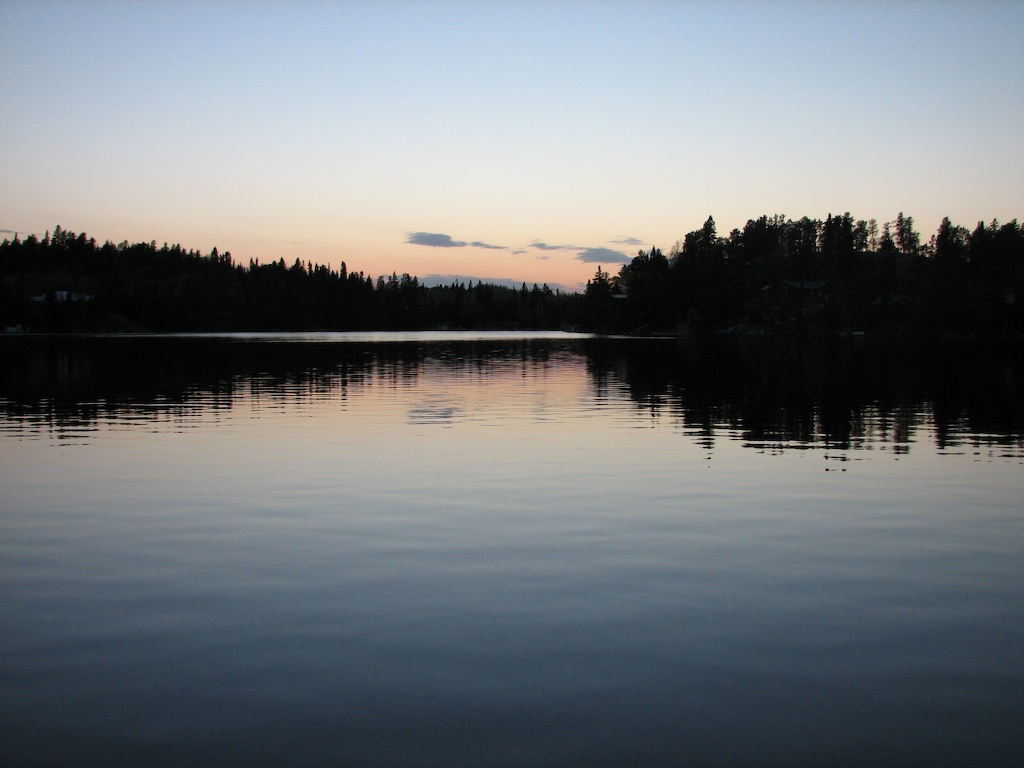
Sampson's Cove

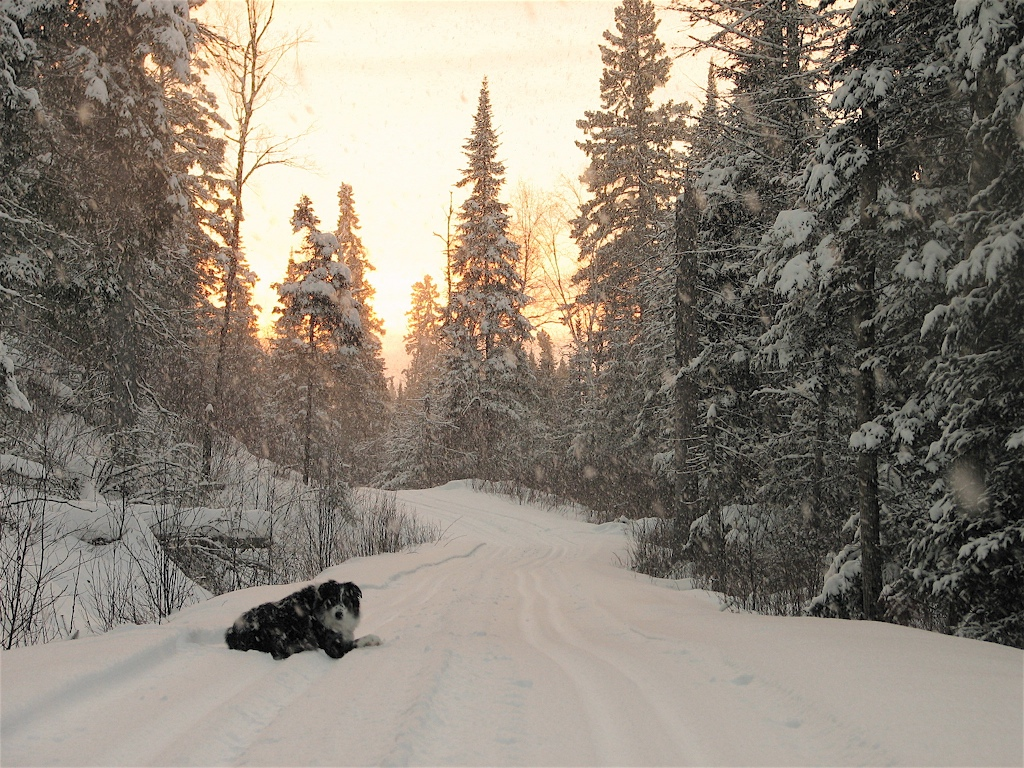
McHugh Lake Loop

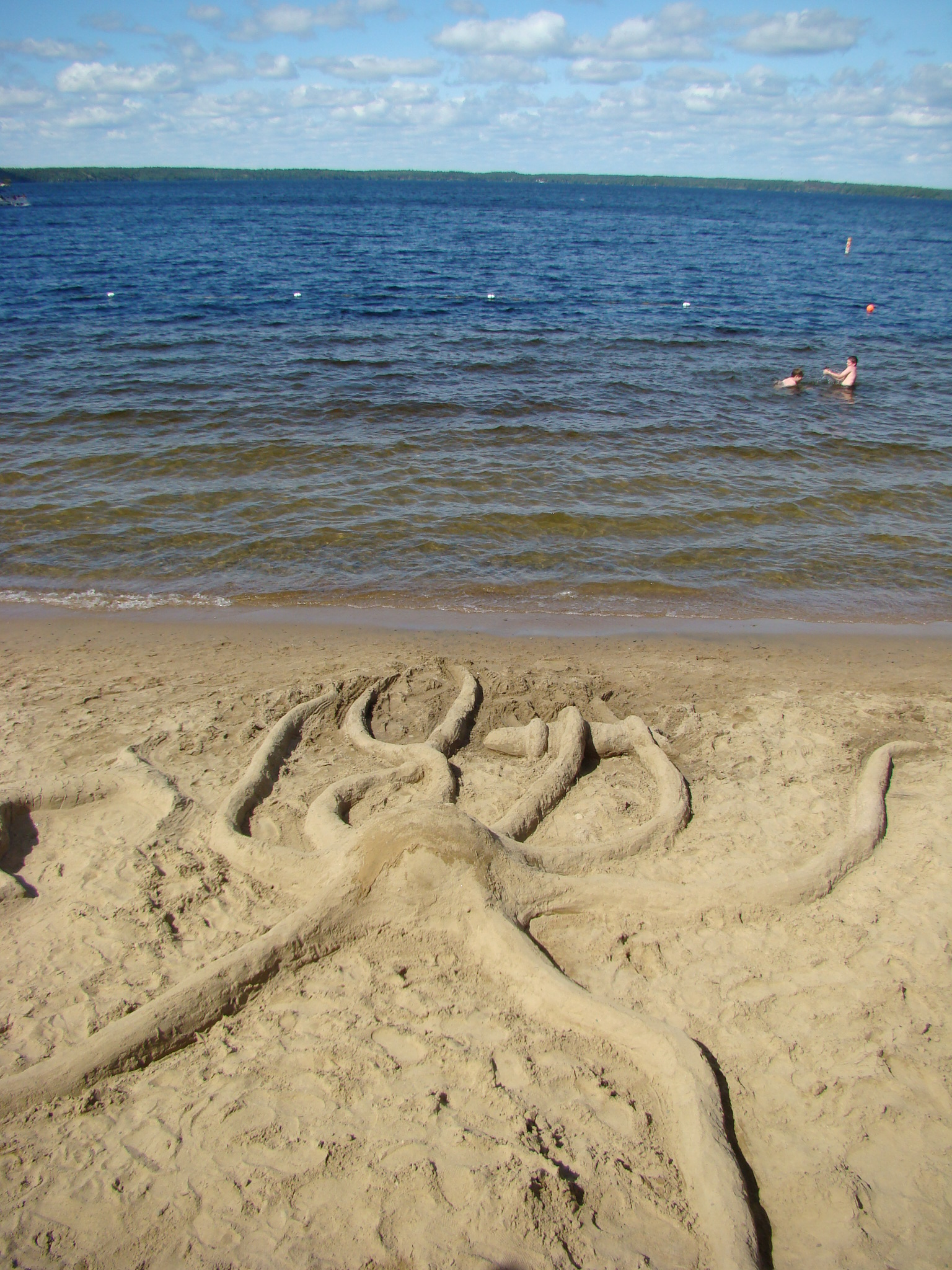
Sand Art at West Hawk Lake

== See also ==
- List of protected areas of Manitoba
- List of provincial parks in Manitoba
- Park ship
