= Mound =

Heaped pile of earth, gravel, sand, rocks, or debris

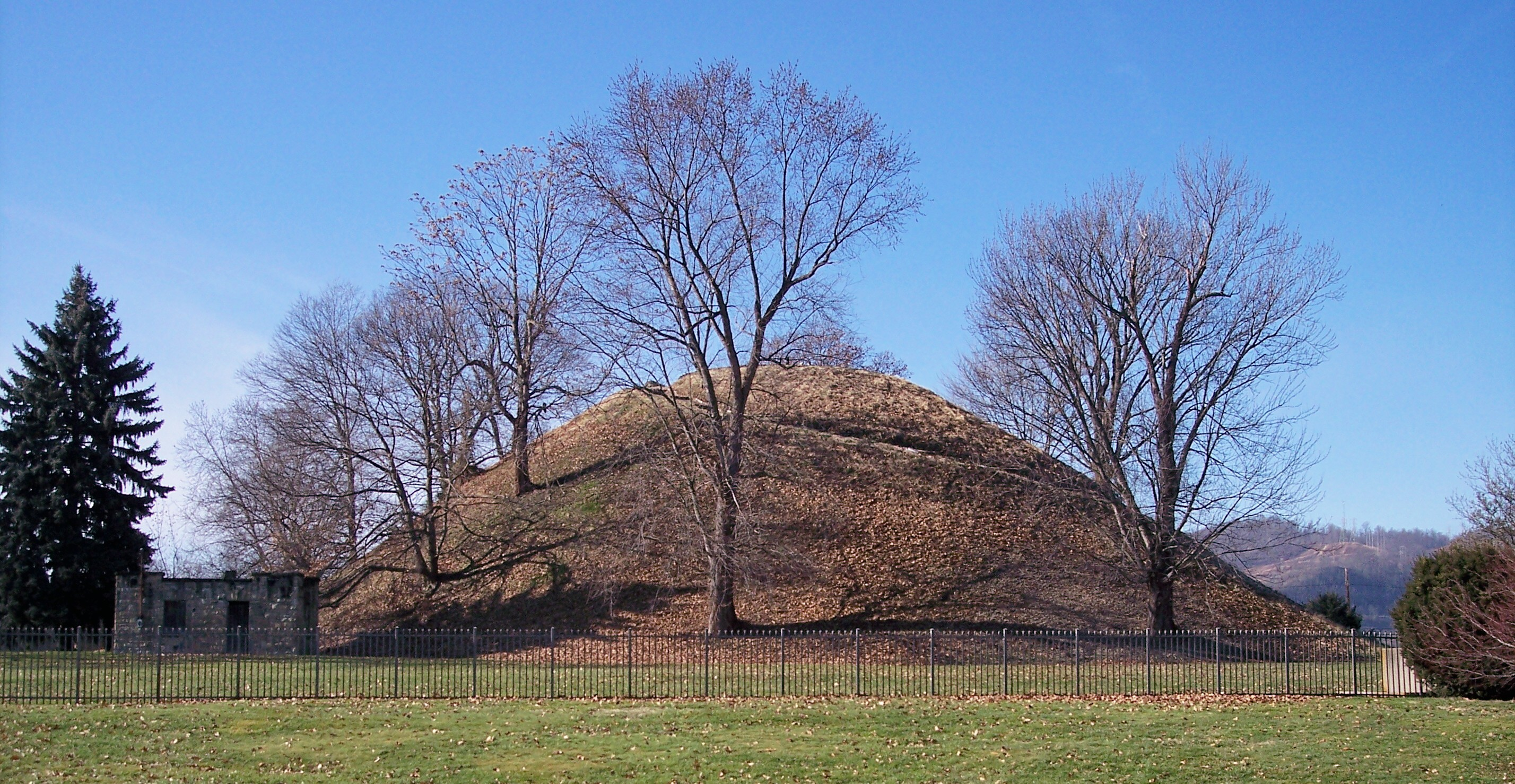
Grave Creek Mound, in Moundsville, West Virginia

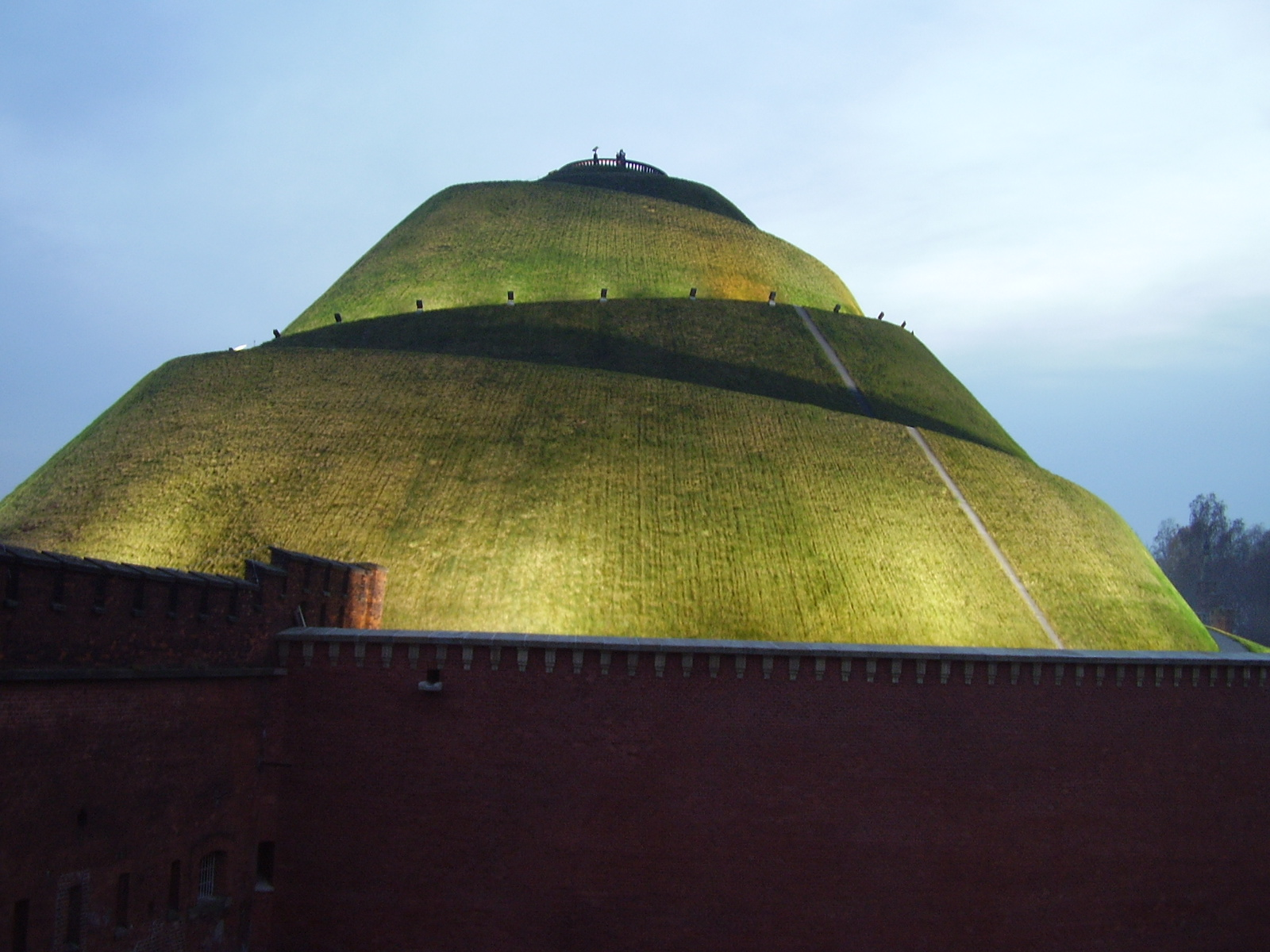
Kościuszko Mound, Kraków, Poland

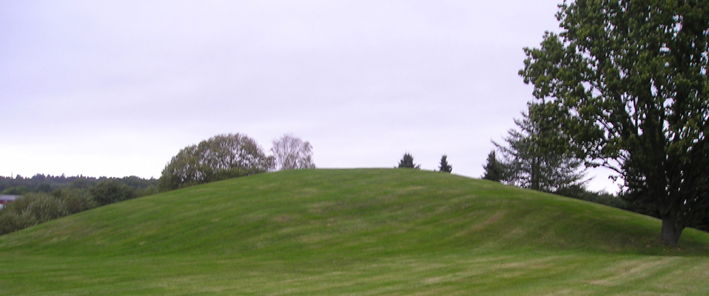
Oseberg Mound, Tønsberg, Norway

A mound is a heaped pile of earth, gravel, sand, rocks, or debris. Most commonly, mounds are earthen formations such as hills and mountains, particularly if they appear artificial. A mound may be any rounded area of topographically higher elevation on any surface. Artificial mounds have been created for a variety of reasons throughout history, including habitation (see Tell and Terp), ceremonial (platform mound), burial (tumulus), and commemorative purposes (e.g. Kościuszko Mound).

== Archaeology ==
=== North American archaeology ===
In the archaeology of the United States and Canada, a mound is a deliberately constructed elevated earthen structure or earthwork, intended for a range of potential uses. In European and Asian archaeology, the word "tumulus" may be used as a synonym for an artificial hill, particularly if the hill is related to particular burial customs.

While the term "mound" may be applied to historic constructions, most mounds in the United States are pre-Columbian earthworks, built by Native American peoples. Native Americans built a variety of mounds, including flat-topped pyramids or cones known as platform mounds, rounded cones, and ridge or loaf-shaped mounds. Some mounds took on unusual shapes, such as the outline of cosmologically significant animals. These are known as effigy mounds. Some mounds, such as a few in Wisconsin, have rock formations, or petroforms, within them, on them, or near them. The Chumash of Southern California built mounds using discarded mollusk shells.

While these mounds are perhaps not as famous as burial mounds, like their European analogs, Native American mounds also have a variety of other uses. While some prehistoric cultures, like the Adena culture, used mounds preferentially for burial, others used mounds for other ritual and sacred acts, as well as for secular functions. The platform mounds of the Mississippian culture, for example, may have supported temples the houses of chiefs, council houses, and may have also acted as a platform for public speaking. Other mounds would have been part of defensive walls to protect a certain area. The Hopewell culture used mounds as markers of complex astronomical alignments related to ceremonies.

Mounds and related earthworks are the only significant monumental construction in pre-Columbian Eastern and Central North American peoples.

Mounds are given different names depending on which culture they stem from. They can be located all across the world in spots such as Asia, Europe and the Americas. "Mound builders" have more commonly been associated with the mounds in the Americas. They all have different meanings and sometimes are constructed as animals and can be clearly seen from aerial views.

=== India ===
==== Kankali Tila ====
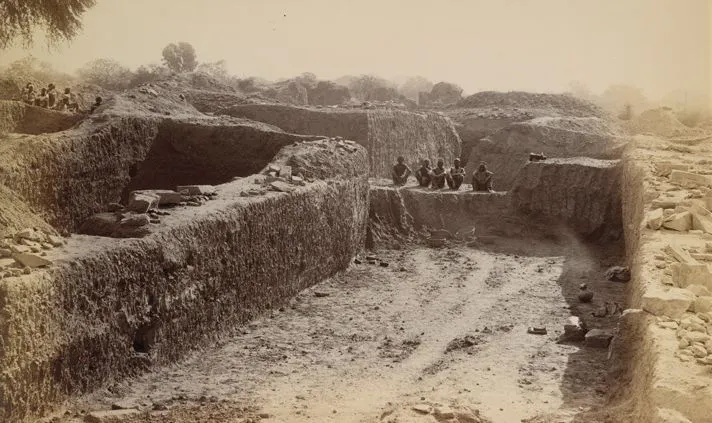
General view of the excavations at Kankali Tila, Mathura, c. 1895

Kankali Tila is a famous mound located at Mathura in the Indian state of Uttar Pradesh. A Jain stupa was excavated here in 1890–91 by Dr. Fuhrer.

==== Mithila ====
In the Mithila region of the Indian subcontinent, mound is referred as dih. The dihas are generally archaeological sites related to ruins of royal palaces, ancient educational institutions and residences of the founders of the villages in the region, etc.

=== Africa ===
Seasonal flooding into the Bulozi Plain meant that the Lozi people in Zambia built their settlements on termite mounds (mazulu) and artificial mounds (liuba).

=== Archaeology elsewhere ===
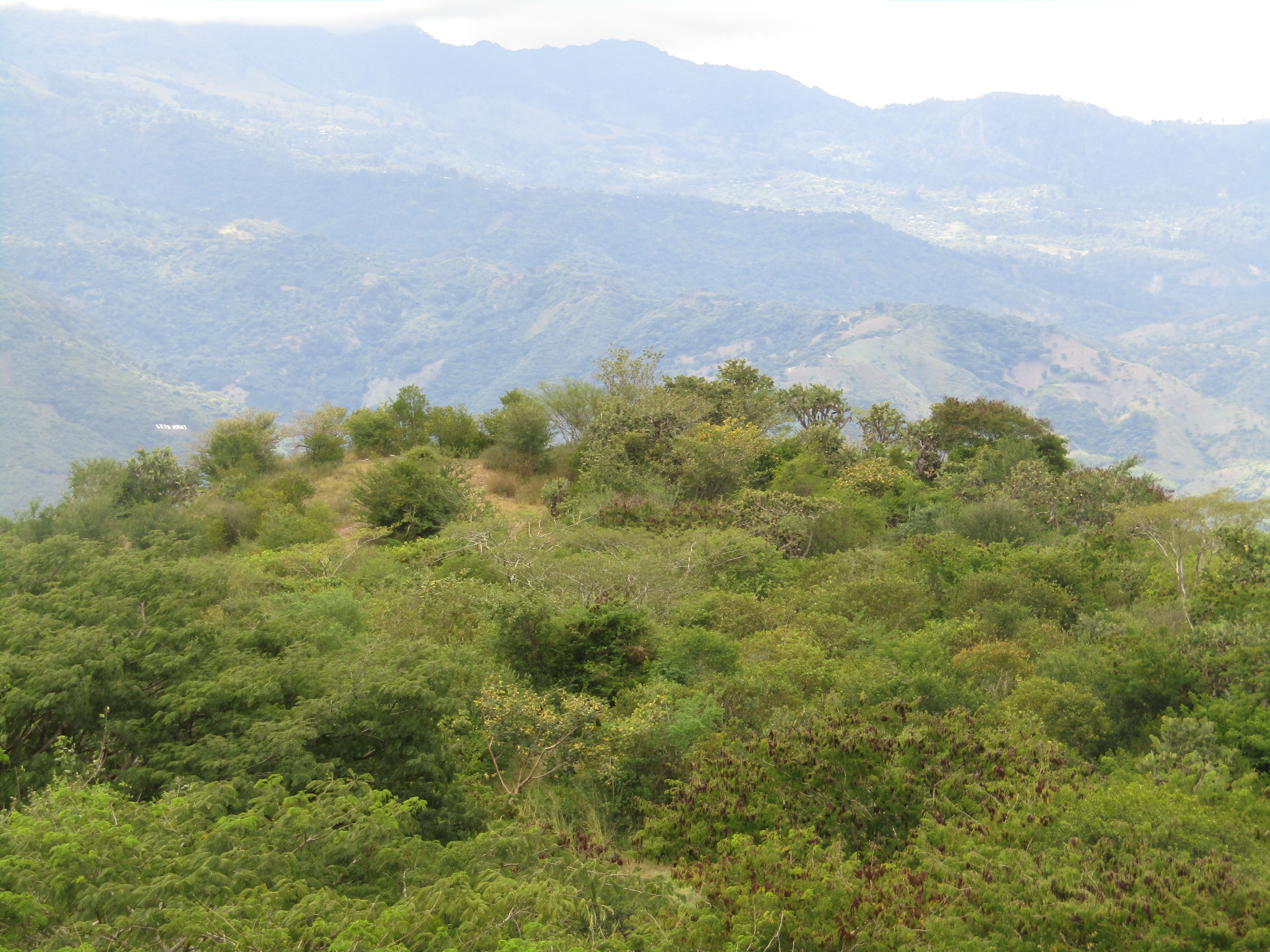
Mound known as Structure 101 located at the Yarumela archeological site in Honduras.

Mound, as a technical term in archaeology, is not generally in favor in the rest of the world. More specific local terminology is preferred, and each of these terms has its own article (see below).

== Mound types ==
- Cairn
  - Chambered cairn
- Effigy mound
- Kofun (Japanese mounds)
- Platform mound
- Subglacial mound
- Tell (also includes multi-lingual synonyms for mounds in the Near East)
- Terp (European dwelling mounds located in wetlands like flood plains and salt marshes)
- Tumulus (barrow)
  - Bank barrow
  - Bell barrow
  - Bowl barrow
  - Chambered long barrow
  - Kurgan
  - Long barrow
  - Oval barrow

== See also ==
- List of burial mounds in the United States
- Fort Ancient
- Kofun period
- Kurgan hypothesis
- Mississippian Period
- Neolithic Europe
- Olmec
  - La Venta
  - San José Mogote
- Petroform
- Pyramid
- Prehistoric Britain
- Stupa
- Woodland Period
  - Crystal River Archaeological State Park
- Ziggurat

Animals

- Mound-building termites
