= Wabunowin =

Native American religion

The Wabunowin (also spelled Wabanowin, Wabenowin, and Wabunohwin; Waabanoowin or Waabanowiwin in the "double-vowel" spelling) is the "Dawn Society", also sometime improperly called the "Magical Dawn Society", a distinct Anishinaabeg society of visionaries, practiced among the Anishinaabeg peoples, consisting of the Algonquin/Nipissing, Ojibwa/Chippewa/Saulteaux/Mississaugas, Odawa, Potawatomi and Anisininew, located primarily in the Great Lakes region of North America. Like the Midewiwin, the Wabunowin is a secretive animistic religion, requiring an initiation, thus early non-indigenous writers lumped the information on the Wabunowin with the Midewiwin. But unlike the Mide, the Waabano have sometimes two levels, and sometimes four. This variation is dependent on the particular lodge.

This society was mentioned in The Song of Hiawatha by Henry Wadsworth Longfellow who used informational materials made available from Henry Schoolcraft to compose the epic poem. The Dawn Society members were systematically imprisoned in mental hospitals by the United States government in the late 19th and early 20th centuries. Because of this persecution, the Wabunowin went underground and have just begun to reemerge in the last decade. While many of the ceremonies and traditions are closely guarded, one that is known is the Fire Dance.

The Waabanowin have reestablished themselves recently. There are active lodges in Saskatchewan, Ontario, Quebec, Indiana, and Michigan.

== Name ==
The word for "dawn" or "east" in the Anishinaabe language is waaban. Its practitioners are called Waabanow (plural: Waabanowag) and the practices of Waabanowin are referred to as the Waabano (often transcribed as "Waubuno"). Unlike the mide where gender-specific references could be made for its practitioners, Waabano does not. Though of differing etymology, culturally, waaban is associated with owaabi'aan (syncoped as waabhaan), "they see them", from waabi′, "to see SOMEBODY". This word association reinforces the idea of the Waabanoog as being visionaries.

== Origin ==
There are differing stories about the origins of the Waabanowin. Many writings put them as a late 19th-century origin, but the members with their oral traditions place the origin many centuries ago. The oral traditions of the lodge put the formation of the society happening shortly after creation.

== Oral tradition ==
The Waabanowin elders trace the origins of the lodge or society to the original teachings of Nanabozho. The stories of Nanabozho are used in the ceremonies and teachings of the Society. Further, the Waabanowin lodge, usually with fewer than 25 participants, but as many as 300, only needed one or two elders to perform the ceremonies, unlike the Midewiwin which required several. This would allow the Waabanowin ceremonies to have existed in the much smaller settlements that the Anishinaabeg lived before contact with Europe.

== Beliefs ==
The Waabanowin have a basic set of beliefs that anthropologists call 'animist.' In many ways, this is correct, but in some ways it is not. They do not believe in a multitude of deities in every living thing. There are Manidoog in all living things and these are spirits but not deities. It is the goal of Waabanow to live a life in balance with everything around them and with all of creation. They do not try to do only good and not bad.

The elders in the Waabano guide those who come to the lodge. It is not their way to dictate what a person believes or does. The Waabanow points the person in the correct direction using the stories and traditions of the lodge. There is no dogma or absolutes. Each person has their own path to walk and their own things to learn because what one person has to learn is different from another; they cannot have absolutes.

There is no effort to convert people to the beliefs of the lodge. People will find their way to the traditions or they will not. It is the belief of the lodge that every person is placed on this earth to learn certain things. Each person has different things to learn. If the individual does not learn his or her individual life purpose lesson, then that individual will come back to this world again; if the individual does learn his or her life purpose lesson, then the individual will move on to the next world and lesson.

== Ceremonies ==
The lodge has several ceremonies they share in common with the other medicine traditions of the Anishinaabe people. They also have ceremonies that are specific to the Dawn Society. While many would like to know more the actual ceremonies are not written down and traditions of the society prohibit the writing or the ceremonies. For these that want to know more it is recommended that they seek out a Waabanowin and learn from the lodge and elders directly. What follows is a basic overview of the ceremonies.

=== Solstice/equinox ceremonies ===
On the solstice and equinox, the lodge performs a set of ceremonies that begin at dusk and end at dawn. Each of the ceremonies differs, with the winter ceremony being the highest ceremony of the lodge. All of the lodge ceremonies begin with a purification done through a Madoodiswan (sweat lodge). After the sweat, the ceremony begins at dusk and goes until dawn.

==== Minookamin ====
The Spring Equinox was the beginning of the new year to the Waabanowin, unlike the dominant Midewiwin whose new year began in Winter. Minookamin (Late Spring) was a time to celebrate and fell just after the Maple camps. During the Spring Ceremony the focus is on the Waabanong Manidoo (Spirit of the East), the Grandfather.

==== Niibin ====
The Summer Solstice is a time of gathering of many villages or bands. The ceremony goes for 4 days and is more of a time of teaching and fellowship. It is normally the largest of the Waabanowin ceremonies in the number of people. The ceremony starts at dusk with the lighting of the Mishi-ishkode or sacred fire.

==== Dagwaagin ====
Like the Spring the dagwaagin (Autumn) ceremony fell just before the Wild rice camps.

==== Biboon ====
Traditionally the Anishinaabe peoples only told certain traditions during biboon (winter). This was because the underwater Manidoo hibernated at that time. Because of this, the Waabanowin would recount the Nanabozho and creation stories as a part of the winter ceremonies. The Ceremony was a teaching time and a prayer for the healing of individuals and aki (Earth). It was at this time that the fire dance was done as a part of the ceremony.

==== Ziigwan ====
Winter Solstice is the most important of all of the Waabanowin ceremonies. It is the time of healing for Aki (Earth) and for personal healing. The traditional ceremony calls for Madoodiswan to be performed at dusk for two days, then again on the solstice, with the sweat ending at dusk. The ceremonies, including the fire dance, go on throughout the longest night of the year. At dawn, the ceremony is finished and the men come out as a Madoodiswan again. They then sweat twice more for the following two days.

=== Personal Healing ===
The Waabanowin are known as spiritual healers. There is a ceremony they perform to bring the person's spirit and body back into alignment, thus healing them. In Waabanowin teachings, sickness that cannot be cured by the herbs and medicines of the herbal healers is caused by those things in a person's life that are out of balance with creation. These can and are performed as needed, but are also part of the Solstice ceremonies.
