= Midewiwin =

Indigenous religious society of North America

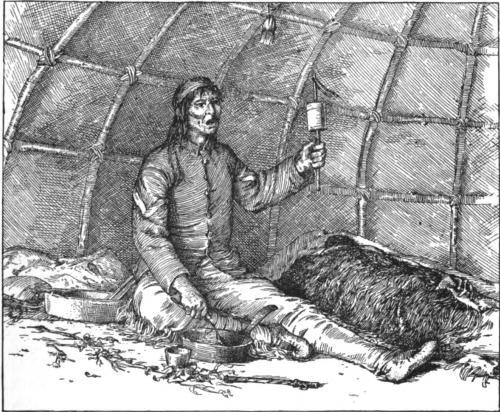
A midew in a mide-wiigiwaam (medicine lodge).

The Midewiwin (in Ojibwe syllabics: ᒥᑌᐧᐃᐧᐃᓐ, also spelled Midewin and Medewiwin) or the Grand Medicine Society is a religious society of some of the Indigenous peoples of the Maritimes, New England, and Great Lakes regions in North America. Its practitioners are called Midew, and the practices of Midewiwin are referred to as Mide. Occasionally, a male Midew is called Midewinini, which is sometimes translated into English as 'medicine man'.

== Etymology ==
Due to the body-part medial de' meaning 'heart' in the Anishinaabe language, Midewiwin is sometimes translated as 'The Way of the Heart'. Minnesota archaeologist Fred K. Blessing shares a definition he received from Thomas Shingobe, a Mida (a Midewiwin person) of the Mille Lacs Indian Reservation in 1969, who told him that "the only thing that would be acceptable in any way as an interpretation of 'Mide' would be 'Spiritual Mystery'." Fluent speakers of Anishinaabemowin often caution that many words and concepts have no direct translation in English.

== Origins ==
According to historian Michael Angel, the Midewin is a "flexible, tenacious tradition that provided an institutional setting for the teaching of the world view (religious beliefs) of the Ojibwa people". Commonly among the Anishinaabeg, Midewin is ascribed to Wenaboozho (Onaniboozh) as its founder. However, among the Abenakis, Midewiwin is ascribed to Mateguas, who bestowed the Midewiwin upon his death to comfort his grieving brother Gluskab, who is still alive. Walter James Hoffman recorded that according to the Mille Lacs Indians chief Bayezhig ('Lone One'), Midewiwin has its origin as:

"In the beginning, Midemanidoo (Gichimanidoo) made the midemanidoowag. He first created two men, and two women; but they had no power of thought or reason. Then Midemanidoo (Gichimanodoo) made them rational beings. He took them in his hands so they could multiply; he paired them and sprung the Anishinaabe from this. When there were people he placed them upon the earth, but he soon observed that they were subject to sickness, misery, and death, and that unless he provided them with the Sacred Medicine they would soon become extinct.

"Between the position occupied by Gichi Manidoo and the earth were four lesser manidoog with whom Gichi Manidoo decided to commune, and to impart to them the mysteries by which the Anishinaabeg could be benefited. So he first spoke to a manidoo and told him all he had to say, who in turn communicated the same information to the next, and he in turn to next, who also communed with the next. They all met in council, and determined to call in the four wind manidoog. After consulting as to what would be best for the comfort and welfare of the Anishinaabeg, these manidoog agreed to ask Gichi Manidoo to communicate the Mystery of the Sacred Medicine to the people.

"Gichi Manidoo then went to the Sun Spirit and asked him to go to the earth and instruct the people as had been decided upon by the council. The Sun Spirit, in the form of a little boy, went to the earth and lived with a woman with a little boy of her own.

"This family went away in the autumn to hunt, and during the winter this woman’s son died. The parents were so much distressed that they decided to return to the village and bury the body there; so they made preparations to return, and as they traveled along, they would each evening erect several poles upon which the body was placed to prevent the wild beasts from devouring it. When the dead boy was thus hanging upon the poles, the adopted child—who was the Sun Spirit—would play about the camp and amuse himself, and finally told his adopted father he pitied him, and his mother, for their sorrow. The adopted son said he could bring his dead brother to life, whereupon the parents expressed great surprise and desired to know how that could be accomplished.

"The adopted boy then had the party hasten to the village, when he said, “Get the women to make a wiigiwaam of bark, put the dead boy in a covering of wiigwaas and place the body on the ground in the middle of the wiigiwaam.” On the next morning after this had been done, the family and friends went into this lodge and seated themselves around the corpse.

"When they had all been sitting quietly for some time, they saw through the doorway the approach of a bear, which gradually came towards the wiigiwaam, entered it, and placed itself before the dead body and said, “ho, ho, ho, ho,” when he passed around it towards the left side, with a trembling motion, and as he did so, the body began quivering, and the quivering increased as the bear continued until he had passed around four times, when the body came to life again and stood up. Then the bear called to the father, who was sitting in the distant right-hand corner of the wiigiwaam, and addressed to him the following words:

Noos	gaawiin	anishinaabewisii,	ayaawiyaan	manidoo	ningwisis.
My father	is not	an Indian not,	I am	a spirit	son.

Bi-mayaa minik	niiji-	manidoo	mayaa	zhigwa	ji-gi-aawiyan.
Insomuch	my fellow	spirit	clearly	now	as you are.

Noose,	zhigwa	asemaa	ji-atooyeg.	E-mikondem	mii	eta
My father,	now	tobacco	you shall put.	He mentions of	that	only

aabiding	ji-gashkitood	wenji-	bimaadizid	omaa	agaawaa
once	to be able to do it	why he shall	live	here	scarcely

bimaadizid	mii	omaa;	niiji-	manidoo	mayaa	zhigwa	ji-giiweyaan.
he lives	thus	here;	my fellow	spirit	clearly	now	I shall go home.

"The little bear boy was the one who did this. He then remained among the Anishinaabeg and taught them the mysteries of the Midewiwin; and, after he had finished, he told his adopted father that as his mission had been fulfilled he was to return to his kindred manidoog, for the Anishinaabeg would have no need to fear sickness as they now possessed the Midewiwin which would enable them to live. He also said that his spirit could bring a body to life but once, and he would now return to the sun from which they would feel his influence."

This event is called Gwiiwizens wedizhichigewinid—Deeds of a Little-boy.

== Associations ==
Mide societies keep wiigwaasabak (birch bark scrolls) that preserve their teachings. They have degrees of initiations and hold ceremonies. They are often associated with the Seven Fires Society, and other Indigenous groups or organizations. The Miigis shell, or cowry shell, is used in some ceremonies, along with bundles, sacred items, etc. There are many oral teachings, symbols, stories, history, and wisdom passed along and preserved from one generation to the next by these groups.

Whiteshell Provincial Park (Manitoba) is named after the whiteshell (cowry) used in Midewiwin ceremonies. This park contains some petroforms that are over 1000 years old, or possibly older, and therefore may predate some aboriginal groups that came later to the area. The Midew society is commemorated in the name of the Midewin National Tallgrass Prairie (Illinois).

== Degrees ==
The Mide practitioners are initiated and ranked by degrees. Much like the apprentice system, masonic degrees, or an academic degree program, a practitioner cannot advance to the next higher degree until completing the required studies, experiences and ceremonies required of that degree. Only after successful completion may a candidate be considered for advancement to the next degree. Of course, from Anishinaabe perspective, there is no level system that can equate to Native Way; it is a projection of thinking. In other words, it is only a general representation in English of complex abstract ideas in Anishinaabemowin.

=== Extended Fourth ===
The accounts regarding the extended Fourth Degrees vary from region to region. All Midewiwin groups claim the extended Fourth Degrees are specialized forms of the Fourth Degree. Depending on the region, these extended Fourth Degree Midew can be called "Fifth Degree" up to "Ninth Degree." In parallel, if the Fourth Degree Midew is to a doctorate degree, the Extended Fourth Degree Midew is to a post-doctorate degree. The Jiisakiwinini is widely referred to by Elders as the "highest" degree of all the medicine practitioners in the Mide, as it is spiritual medicine as opposed to physical/plant based medicine.

== Medicine lodge ==
=== Midewigaan ===
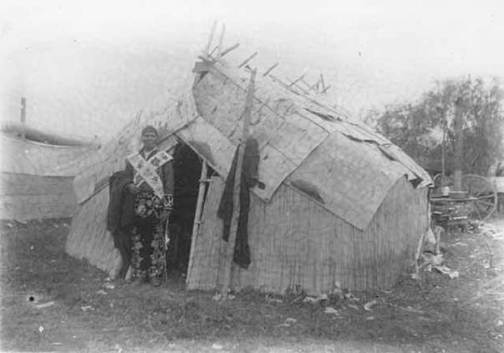
A midewigaan

The midewigaan ('mide lodge'), also known as mide-wiigiwaam ('mide wigwam') when small or midewigamig ('mide structure') when large, is known in English as the Grand Medicine Lodge and is usually built in an open grove or clearing. A midewigaan is a domed structure with the proportion of one unit in width by four units in length. Though Hoffman records these domed oval structures measuring about 20 feet (6.1 m) in width by 80 feet (24 m) in length, the structures are sized to accommodate the number of invited participants, thus many midewigaan for small mide communities in the early 21st century are as small as 6 feet (1.8 m) in width and 24 feet (7.3 m) in length and larger in those communities with more mide participants. The walls of the smaller mide-wiigiwaam consist of poles and saplings from 8 to 10 feet (2.4 to 3.0 m) high, firmly planted in the ground, wattled with short branches and twigs with leaves. In communities with significantly large mide participants (usually of 100 people or more participants), the midewigamig becomes a formal and permanent ceremonial building that retains the dimensions of the smaller mide-wiigiwaam; a midewigamig might not necessarily be a domed structure, but typically may have vaulted ceilings.

=== Jiisakiiwigaan ===
Design of the jiisakiiwigaan ('juggler's lodge' or 'Shaking Tent' or traditionally 'shaking wigwam') is similar in construction as that of the mide-wiigiwaam. Unlike a mide-wiigiwaam that is an oval domed structure, the jiisakiiwigaan is a round high-domed structure of typically 3 feet (0.91 m) in diameter and 6 feet (1.8 m) in height, and large enough to hold two to four people.

== Ceremonies ==
=== Annual and seasonal ceremonies ===
- Aabita-biboon (Midwinter Ceremony)
- Animoosh ([White] Dog Ceremony)
- Jiibay-inaakewin or Jiibenaakewin (Feast of the Dead)
- Gaagaagiinh or Gaagaagishiinh (Raven Festival)
- Zaazaagiwichigan (Painted Pole Festival)
- Mawineziwin ('War [Remembrance] Dance')
- Wiikwandiwin ([Seasonal] Ceremonial Feast)—performed four times per year, once per season. The Wiikwandiwin is begun with a review of the past events, hope for a good future, a prayer and then the smoking of the pipe carried out by the heads of the doodem. These ceremonies are held in mid-winter and mid-summer to bring together people various medicines and combine their healing powers for revitalization. Each Wiikwandiwin is a celebration to give thanks, show happiness and respect to Gichi-manidoo. It is customary to share the first kill of the season during the Wiikwandiwin. This would show Gichi-manidoo thanks and also ask for a blessing for the coming hunt, harvest and season.

=== Rites of passage ===
- Nitaawigiwin (Birth rites)—ceremony in which a newborn's umbilical cord is cut and retained
- Waawiindaasowin (Naming rites)—ceremony in which a name-giver presents a name to a child
- Oshki-nitaagewin (First-kill rites)—ceremony in which a child's first successful hunt is celebrated
- Makadekewin (Puberty fast rites)
- Wiidigendiwin (Marriage rites)—ceremony in which a couple is joined into a single household
- Bagidinigewin (Death rites)—wake, funeral and funerary feast

=== Miscellaneous ceremonies ===
- Jiisakiiwin (Shaking tent)—ceremony conducted by a Shaking-tent seer (jaasakiid; a male jaasakiid known as a jiisakiiwinini or a female jaasakiid known as a jiisakiiwikwe), often called a juggler in English, who would enter the tent to conjure spirits and speak beyond this world.
- Bagisewin (Present)—custom at the end of a wedding ceremony in which the bride presents wood at the groom's feet as a wedding present.
- Ishkwaandem-wiikwandiwin (Entry-way Feast)—A ceremony performed by women who took a piece of wood out to the bushes to offer it to Gichi-manidoo, and brought something back as well. This ceremony represents the woman as Mother Earth who asked for blessing from Gichi-manidoo so that the home would be safe and warm.

== Teaching objects ==
=== Teaching scrolls ===
Called wiigwaasabakoon in the Ojibwe language, birch bark scrolls were used to pass on knowledge between generations. When used specifically for Midewiwin ceremonial use, these wiigwaasabakoon used as teaching scrolls were called Mide-wiigwaas ('Medicine birch [bark scroll]'). Early accounts of the Mide from 19th-century books describe a group of elders that protected the birch bark scrolls in hidden locations. They recopied the scrolls if any were badly damaged, and they preserved them underground. These scrolls were described as very sacred and the interpretations of the scrolls were not easily given away. The historical areas of the Ojibwe were recorded, and stretched from the east coast all the way to the prairies by way of lake and river routes. Some of the first maps of rivers and lakes were made by the Ojibwe and written on birch bark.

"The Teachings of the Midewiwin were scratched on birch bark scrolls and were shown to the young men upon entrance into the society. Although these were crude pictographs representing the ceremonies, they show us that the Ojibwa were advanced in the development of picture 'writing.' Some of them were painted on bark. One large birch bark roll was 'known to have been used in the Midewiwin at Mille Lacs for five generations and perhaps many generations before', and two others, found in a seemingly deliberate hiding place in the Head-of-the-Lakes region of Ontario, were carbon-dated to about 1560 CE +/-70. The author of the original report on these hidden scrolls advised: "Indians of this region occasionally deposited such artifacts in out-of-the-way places in the woods, either by burying them or by secreting them in caves. The period or periods at which this was done is far from clear. But in any event, archaeologists should be aware of the custom and not overlook the possibility of their discovery."

=== Teaching stones ===
Teaching stones, known in Ojibwe as either Gikinoo'amaagewaabik or Gikinoo'amaage-asin, can be either petroglyphs or petroform.

== Seven prophetical ages ==
The Seven Fires prophecy was originally taught among the practitioners of Midewiwin. Each fire represents a prophetical age, marking phases or epochs of Turtle Island. It represents key spiritual teachings for North America and suggests that the different colors and traditions of humans can come together on the basis of respect. The Algonquins are the keepers of the seven fires prophecy wampum.

== See also ==
- Abenaki mythology
- Adena culture
- Ani-kutani
- Animism
- Anishinaabe traditional beliefs
- Fort Ancient
- Hopewell tradition
- The Red Road
- Seven fires prophecy
- Tengrism
- Wabunowin
- Walam Olum
