= West Hawk Lake =

Lake in Manitoba, Canada

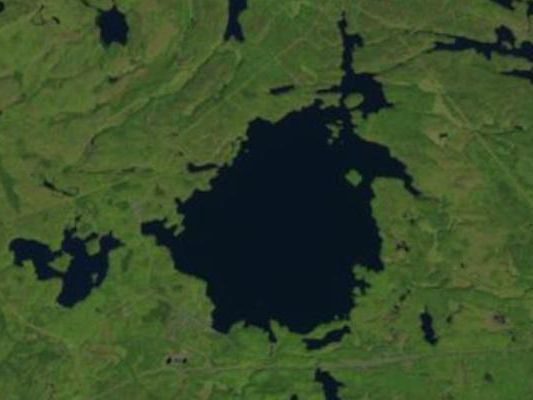
- Satellite image (Landsat)

- Location of the lake in Manitoba West Hawk Lake (Canada)
- Location: Whiteshell Provincial Park, Manitoba
- Coordinates: 49°45′54″N 95°11′16″W
- Type: Impact crater lake
- Primary inflows: numerous small streams and underground springs
- Primary outflows: Whiteshell River
- Basin countries: Canada
- Max. length: 4.5 km (2.8 mi)
- Max. width: 3.6 km (2.2 mi)
- Surface area: 16.2 km^{2} (6.3 sq mi)
- Max. depth: 115 m (377 ft)
- Surface elevation: 329 m (1,079 ft)
- Islands: 12
- Website: Parks and protected spaces

West Hawk Lake is an impact crater lake on the Whiteshell River located in the Whiteshell Provincial Park in southeastern Manitoba, Canada. The circular shape of the main body of the lake is due to the submerged West Hawk crater, caused by a meteor impact into an ancient rock bed composed of mostly granite. At 115 metres (377 ft), it is the deepest lake in Manitoba. It is 2.44 km in diameter and the age is estimated to be 351 ± 20 million years (Mississippian).

Granite cliffs surround parts of the lake. This area is also known as part of the Canadian Shield that was formed billions of years ago. Parts of the Whiteshell park have elaborate petroforms that were made by First Nation peoples, possibly over a thousand years ago. There are petroform shapes of turtles, snakes, humans, and geometrical patterns, often found upon pink granite ridges that were shaped during the last ice age.

A marine glacial relict, the Deepwater sculpin is found in West Hawk Lake.

The lake has private cottages, public beaches, campgrounds, and other tourism amenities, and extensive undeveloped shoreline, and is popular for boating, sailing, Wakeboarding, and scuba diving. It is just north of the Trans-Canada Highway, and on the Trans Canada Trail, on the border of Manitoba and Ontario.

== See also ==
- List of lakes of Manitoba
