= Petroform =

Human-made shapes and patterns of rocks placed on the ground

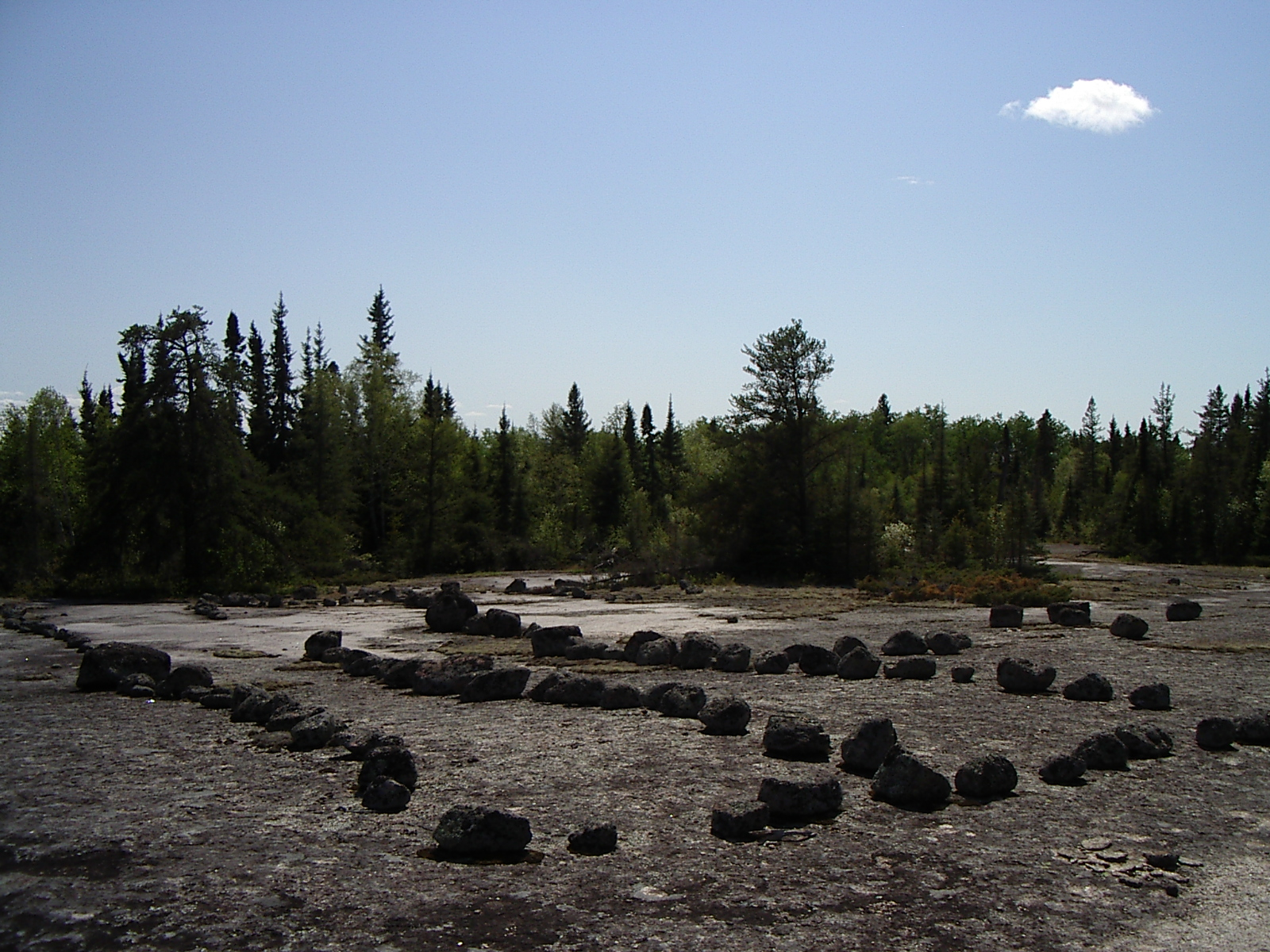
Aligned boulders at Whiteshell Park, Manitoba

Petroforms, also known as boulder outlines or boulder mosaics, are human-made shapes and patterns made by lining up large rocks on the open ground, often on quite level areas. Petroforms in North America were originally made by various Native American and First Nation tribes, who used various terms to describe them. Petroforms can also include a rock cairn or inukshuk, an upright monolith slab, a medicine wheel, a fire pit, a desert kite, sculpted boulders, or simply rocks lined up or stacked for various reasons. Old World petroforms include the Carnac stones and many other megalithic monuments.

== Definition ==
Petroforms are shapes and geometrical patterns made from arranging large rocks and boulders, often over large areas of open ground, unlike the smaller petroglyphs and graphs which are inscribed on rock surfaces. They were originally made in North America by native peoples for astronomical, religious, sacred, healing, mnemonic devices, and teaching purposes. The specific names of these rock formations and the uses varied by political and religious group. Presently, some of these sites are still being used by First Nations, elders, and others.

== History ==
The first stone phase at Stonehenge has been dated to about 2600 BCE. Stone circles are still being made in Wales as part of the Eisteddfod movement, which incorporates this among other elements from the Druidic revival. Desert kites were used possibly by 3000 BCE; they fell out of use in the Neolithic as prey populations declined and the human population rose.

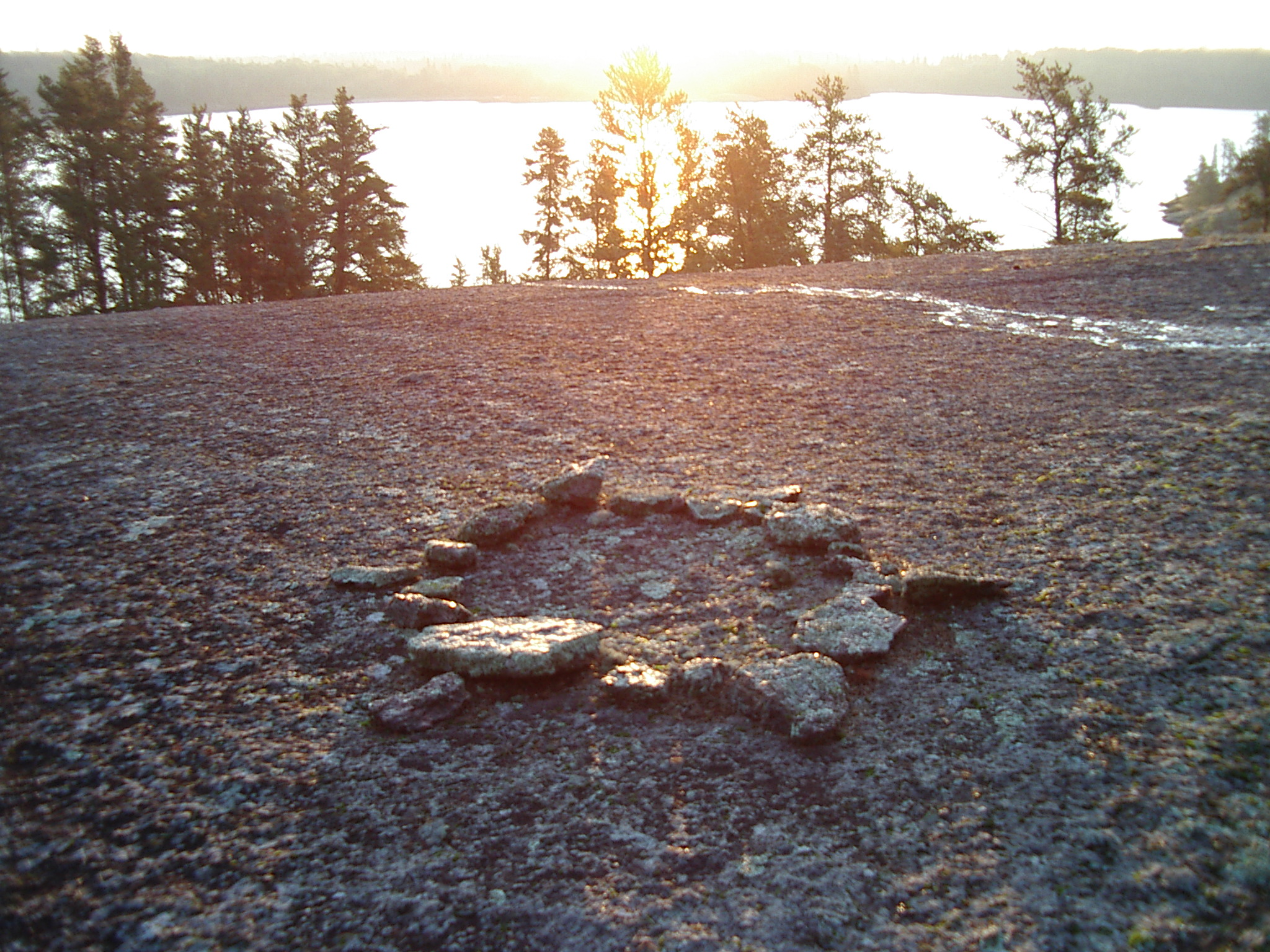
Turtle petroform in Whiteshell Provincial Park, Manitoba

Some of the North American petroform shapes are over 2,500 years old. It is difficult to date all of them accurately because of a lack of soil deposits in some areas. Like the petroglyphs, many petroforms have complex and lengthy teachings that have been passed down orally by the Ojibwe, other First Nations, and the Midewiwin. Some teachings may have been lost, along with the peoples that originally made some of the oldest petroforms in North America. In some North American states and provinces, there are laws to protect these important archaeological and historical sites. There were very few studies or specific mention of Manitoba petroform sites until the 20th century. The first detailed studies and descriptions of some sites in Manitoba were done by J. Steinbring and R. Sutton after the 1950s.

Presently, many Ojibwe or Anishinaabe ceremonies in North America involve the making of turtle-shaped fire pits for sacred fires. In some instances, rocks are aligned near the entrance and fire of sweat lodge ceremonies that symbolize the Moon, the Sun and other things. Rock piles are still made to mark trails and important locations. A large turtle petroform of piled up boulders was recently made in the Whiteshell Park area of Manitoba.

== Designs and purposes ==
In some cases, petroforms were made by non-literate cultures who have left no written record of whatever reasons led them to construct these forms. Oral history was passed along by many native groups, and a few groups had very complex symbolic writings on rock, petroglyphs, birch bark scrolls, and other media.

=== Astronomical markers ===
Some petroforms were used as astronomical calendars, with rocks aligned to solstice and equinox sunrises and sunsets. They are often found in higher areas, on hills, mounds, ridges, and natural rock formations. Higher ground allowed humans to carefully observe the horizon to mark and measure astronomical events. Some rock alignments point out four or more directions, lunar events, the rising and setting of planets, some stars, and other astronomical events. Some petroforms can also be used in more complex ways for astronomical predictions, mapping of the sky and ground, and for complex ceremonies that help to memorize many oral stories and songs. Petroforms are similar in some ways to medicine wheels which are also aligned with sunrises and sunsets, equinoxes, solstices, lunar events, and star patterns. Petroforms also mirrored the night sky, and the patterns of the stars, similar to astrological signs and symbols. The Sioux have oral stories of the serpent in the sky, a turtle, a bear, and other patterns seen in the stars. What is often known today as Orion's belt was one prominent, bright star formation, along with the central and stationary north star, now named as Polaris. What is now known as the planet Venus is the very bright morning and evening star that is very noticeable and at times is the first and last to appear. Petroform sites in North America can be found in Manitoba, Saskatchewan, Alberta, Wisconsin, Minnesota, Wyoming, Montana, along the Mississippi River, the Missouri River, and elsewhere. It has been suggested that megalithic monuments including Stonehenge may have incorporated important astronomical alignments.

=== Hunting aids ===
The desert kites of Syria, Jordan, and the Negev—long lines of stones—are interpreted as aids to hunting large game animals like gazelles, ibexes, and wild asses. There are similar structures on most continents.

=== Navigation aids ===
The inuksuit of the Arctic act as navigation aids, an aid for hunting, or to mark important locations. The rock marker helped the traveler or hunter to find the best route across the land. Someone left a marker to help anyone else passing through the area, and to help with not getting lost. These markers can have very practical and universal purposes. Some petroforms are located along portage routes and canoe routes as well. Human made markers can be easier to remember than common natural features of the landscape. Rock ridges would have been natural trails through dense forest or wet terrain. Whiteshell Provincial Park petroforms are located on top of the granite ridges that snake through the forest and wetlands landscape.

=== Burial sites ===
The Dolmens widespread in Europe and much of Asia are interpreted as Neolithic burial chambers. Large boulders make excellent long term markers for important and sacred places, just as burial plots are marked by large stones today. Some petroforms could be close to ancient burial areas, or near sacred areas associated with the dead. Large rocks are a universal marker that can last for generations. Boulders will last for tens of thousands of years. In memory of a person or the history about a place, these markers help future generations to learn about the past. These markers help to provide long term memories and reminders of a time long ago.

=== Mnemonic device ===
Indigenous peoples have an oral tradition of story telling. Many of these rock shapes are used to memorize and to help tell stories and legends. Some petroforms go in the order of the story, helping one to memorize the successive steps. Large rocks are very permanent, thereby helping to pass along certain memories, knowledge, and wisdom. Some large boulders in North America have long stories that relate to the area and a memory about that place. A large boulder, sitting alone, catches the eye as a major landmark. Many petroforms in Whiteshell Provincial Park have long stories associated with each one.

=== Other rituals and unknown purposes ===
Aboriginal groups also made shapes of humans, snakes, turtles, fish, bears, cougars, thunderbirds, medicine wheels, circles, rectangles, and other complex geometric shapes that are still intact today. There was certainly an attempt to leave their mark upon the landscape, and large boulders or rocks are very permanent markers. The Nazca Lines include many animal and other shapes. Petroforms in North America are often related to earthen mounds. Mounds were sometimes built over the older petroforms, or later made near them. Petroforms also marked out the area for various ceremonies, sweatlodges, fasting, and sacred fires. They often mark an important or sacred area, or point to an important place. Offerings and prayers are made in these areas, along with initiations and vision quests. The exact, original purposes of the Carnac stones, Stonehenge, and many other megalithic monuments are lost.

== Localities ==
=== Whiteshell Provincial Park ===
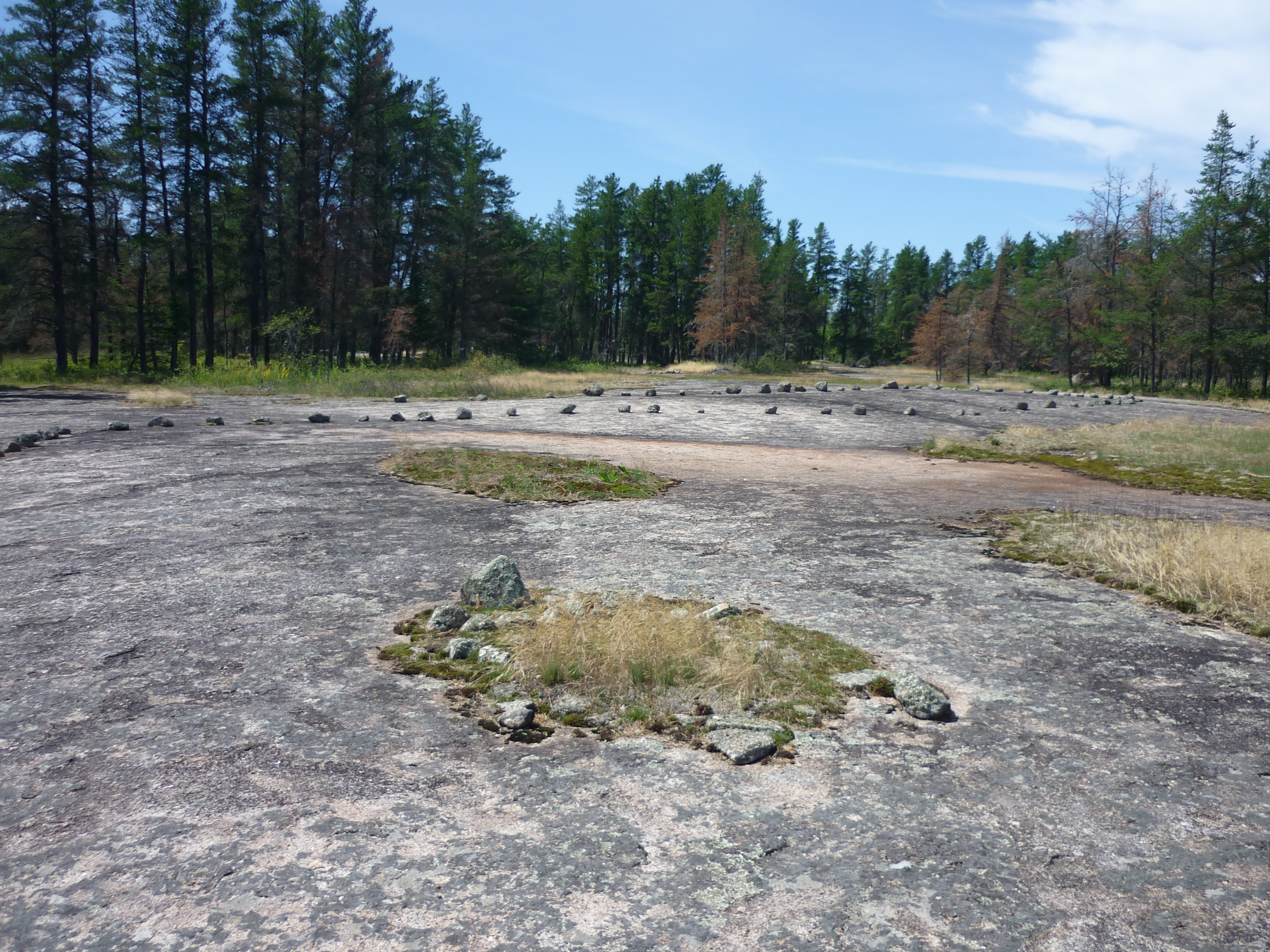
Petroforms in Whiteshell Provincial Park

One of the locations of petroform sites, including effigies, is in Southeastern Manitoba, in Whiteshell Provincial Park, Canada. Whiteshell Park is named after the white cowrie shells used by some Anishinaabe peoples in ceremonies. The natural landscape of the park, with many movable rocks and boulders left behind after the last ice age, gave humans the easy opportunity to arrange them into many human-made patterns. It is an area where three rivers meet, along the edge of the Canadian Shield, close to the edge of prairie grasslands. The rivers were ancient highways and trade routes, bringing humans from far and wide to the area. Some large boulders appear to be carved, chipped, or altered to look like turtle heads and other animals. A very wide variety of petroform shapes are found in the park, including snakes, turtles, geometric lines, patterns, and large circles. Most of the known petroforms are found on the top of granite ridges. The granite ridges and hills are often very flat in areas, resembling a large concrete parking lot. These open areas have a very smooth granite left behind from the last ice age. In some areas there is no soil, no lichen, and the surface is polished to a shine. The large boulders aligned are in striking contrast to the flat granite beneath them. Local First Nations have teachers and elders that pass along the stories associated with some of these petroforms. Many of the sites and their past use is a mystery, with no certain answers. Some elders refer to one site as extremely sacred and important, and few people should venture there. The Midewiwin have oral teachings about some of the petroforms, but no one group claims to know all the history of the area.

=== Wisconsin ===
The petroform sites in Wisconsin are being studied more closely, and can be dated more easily because of soil deposits over centuries. Many other sites have no layers of soil deposited around the petroforms. Forested areas and soil cover have partially protected many of the petroforms in Wisconsin and Minnesota. In many areas across the prairies, large circular medicine wheels were made as astronomical devices, directional maps, and for ceremonial use. Some of these medicine wheels are large, and many were destroyed for agricultural needs by clearing the grasslands of any rocks. Some are intact, such as in the Turtle Mountains, and other sandy, rocky, or more remote areas that had less crop farms and settlements. Mound building was also associated in some way with petroform use. Petroforms originally predated the use of mounds and other human-made earthen works that required more time and effort. Although mound building could have originally been necessary and practical to provide some higher ground during floods. There is some speculation that larger mounds would have served as dikes and defensive fortifications, including providing higher ground to keep watch.

== See also ==
- Buffalo jump
- Cairn
- Hopewell culture
- Inukshuk
- Mound
- Mound builder (people)
- Petroglyph
- Petrosomatoglyph
- Pictograph
- Rock art
