= Jurisdiction stripping =

United States legal term

In United States law, jurisdiction-stripping (also called court-stripping or curtailment-of-jurisdiction) is the limiting or reducing of a court's jurisdiction by Congress through its constitutional authority to determine the jurisdiction of federal courts and to exclude or remove federal cases from state courts.

== Basis ==
Congress may define the jurisdiction of the judiciary through the simultaneous use of two powers. First, Congress holds the power to create (and, implicitly, to define the jurisdiction of) federal courts inferior to the Supreme Court (i.e. Courts of Appeals, District Courts, and various other Article I and Article III tribunals). This court-creating power is granted both in the congressional powers clause (Art. I, § 8, Cl. 9) and in the judicial vesting clause (Art. III, § 1). Second, Congress has the power to make exceptions to and regulations of the appellate jurisdiction of the Supreme Court. This court-limiting power is granted in the Exceptions Clause (Art. III, § 2). By exercising these powers in concert, Congress may effectively eliminate any judicial review of certain federal legislative or executive actions and of certain state actions, or alternatively transfer the judicial review responsibility to state courts by "knocking [federal courts] ... out of the game."

Alexander Hamilton said the following about the issue in The Federalist Papers:

From this review of the particular powers of the federal judiciary, as marked out in the Constitution, it appears that they are all conformable to the principles which ought to have governed the structure of that department, and which were necessary to the perfection of the system. If some partial inconveniences should appear to be connected with the incorporation of any of them into the plan, it ought to be recollected that the national legislature will have ample authority to make such exceptions, and to prescribe such regulations as will be calculated to obviate or remove these inconveniences.

== Transfer of authority to state judiciaries ==
Framers of the Constitution, such as Roger Sherman of Connecticut, did not envision jurisdiction stripping as invariably insulating a law from judicial review, and instead foresaw that state judiciaries could determine compatibility of certain types of state statutes with federal laws and the federal Constitution. In 1788, Sherman publicly explained that,

It was thought necessary in order to carry into effect the laws of the Union, to promote justice, and preserve harmony among the states, to extend the judicial powers of the United States to the enumerated cases, under such regulations and with such exceptions as shall be provided by law, which will doubtless reduce them to cases of such magnitude and importance as cannot be safely trusted to the final decisions of the courts of particular states; and the constitution does not make it necessary that any inferior tribunals should be instituted, but it may be done if found necessary; 'tis probable that courts of particular states will be authorized by the laws of the union, as has heretofore been done in cases of piracy, &c. ...

Thus, there are two kinds of jurisdiction-stripping: one which changes the court that will hear the case (as Sherman envisioned), versus one which essentially insulates statutes from judicial review altogether. Jurisdiction-stripping statutes usually take away no substantive rights but rather change the court that will hear the case.

Congress has sometimes limited federal involvement in state cases, for example by setting a minimum amount in controversy in order to bar the lower federal courts from hearing diversity cases that involve less than that amount (currently $75,000), combined with precluding a right to appeal to the Supreme Court. Likewise, Congress has never required that state court cases involving federal questions be removed or appealed to federal court, and so the federal courts are unable to exercise power in many of those cases.

== Limits ==
Congress may not strip the U.S. Supreme Court of jurisdiction over those cases that fall under the Court's original jurisdiction defined in the U.S. Constitution. Congress can limit only the appellate jurisdiction of the Court. According to the Constitution, the Supreme Court has original jurisdiction in, "all Cases affecting Ambassadors, other public Ministers and Consuls, and those in which a State shall be Party. ... " This last state-shall-be-a-party language has not been interpreted by the Court as meaning that it has original jurisdiction merely because a state is a plaintiff or defendant, even if a provision of the U.S. Constitution is at issue. Rather, the Court has stated that the controversy must be between two or more states, or between a state and citizens of another state, or between a state and foreigners. Additionally, in 1892, the Court decided that it has original jurisdiction in cases between a state and the United States.

=== Story's theory ===
Justice Joseph Story, in his opinion in Martin v. Hunter's Lessee and in his other writings, wrote extensively about how Congress should ensure that the judicial power is properly vested in the federal courts. Professor Akhil Amar credits Story with the theory that Congress may not concurrently remove the jurisdiction of inferior courts and the appellate jurisdiction of the Supreme Court over certain categories of claims, as doing so would violate the Constitution's mandatory grant of jurisdiction over such claims to the judiciary as a whole. Story wrote in Martin v. Hunter's Lessee:

The judicial power shall extend to all the cases enumerated in the constitution. As the mode is not limited, it may extend to all such cases, in any form, in which judicial power may be exercised. It may, therefore, extend to them in the shape of original or appellate jurisdiction, or both; for there is nothing in the nature of the cases which binds to the exercise of the one in preference to the other.

According to Amar, Story's exposition of federal court jurisdiction "has generated considerable confusion" and furthermore, as Amar understands Story's theory, it "simply cannot be right". Professor Henry M. Hart instead argued that Congress may strip the power of the federal judiciary to hear certain classes of cases. Hart wrote: "In the scheme of the Constitution [state courts] are the primary guarantors of constitutional rights, and in many cases they may be the ultimate ones."

=== Calabresi's theory ===
In 2007, law professors Steven Calabresi and Gary Lawson opined that Congress can strip the U.S. Supreme Court of appellate jurisdiction only to the extent that Congress expands the Court's original jurisdiction. Calabresi and Lawson acknowledged that their theory contradicts the holding of Marbury v. Madison, according to which the Constitution's description of the Court's original jurisdiction is exhaustive.

According to Calabresi and Lawson, Congress has no ability to alter or make exceptions to the judicial power of the United States, or to do anything less than bring the full judicial power into execution. The Calabresi theory finds support in a 2010 article by Washburn University Law Professor Alex Glashausser. On the other hand, Judge William A. Fletcher wrote an article in 2010 taking the opposite point of view.

=== Related issues ===
Generally speaking, the word "power" is not necessarily synonymous with the word "jurisdiction". For instance, courts will often assert a modest degree of power over a case for purposes of determining whether it has jurisdiction, or for purposes of receiving jurisdiction.

The Constitution vests the judicial power "in one supreme Court, and in such inferior courts as the Congress may from time to time establish" (emphasis added). Scholars have debated whether the word "in" means that the entire judicial power is vested in the Supreme Court and is also vested entirely in the inferior courts; that possibility has implications for what the vesting of such power means.

== Other relevant Supreme Court cases ==
During Reconstruction, Congress withdrew jurisdiction from a case the U.S. Supreme Court was then in the process of adjudicating. In terminating the case Ex Parte McCardle, 74 US 506 (1869), the Justices acknowledged the authority of Congress to intervene.

We are not at liberty to inquire into the motives of the legislature. We can only examine into its power under the Constitution; and the power to make exceptions to the appellate jurisdiction of this court is given by express words. ... It is quite clear, therefore, that this court cannot proceed to pronounce judgment in this case, for it has no longer jurisdiction of the appeal; and judicial duty is not less fitly performed by declining ungranted jurisdiction than in exercising firmly that which the Constitution and the laws confer.

In 1882, the Supreme Court again conceded that its own "actual jurisdiction is confined within such limits as Congress sees fit to describe."

In 1948, Supreme Court Justice Felix Frankfurter conceded in a dissenting opinion that "Congress need not give this Court any appellate power; it may withdraw appellate jurisdiction once conferred."

In 1972, Chief Justice Warren Burger made it known, concurring with the denial of certiorari to Volpe v. D. C. Federation of Civic Associations, that he believed Congress could do anything in its power to make its intentions clear, "even to the point of limiting or prohibiting judicial review of its directives in this respect." This was recorded in reference to a particular dispute with a court of appeal, which he accused of "unjustifiably frustrat[ing] the efforts of the Executive Branch to comply with the will of Congress." However, 10 days earlier, President Nixon had made a statement indicating his opposition to school busing for racial integration. In that context, Burger's statement was interpreted at the time as suggesting that Congress prohibit busing with legislation and enforce that legislation with jurisdiction stripping.

== In-exhaustive list of federal jurisdiction stripping statutes ==
There are a number of current federal statutes that strip courts of jurisdiction. The following is an in-exhaustive list:

- Section 102 of the Illegal Immigration Reform and Immigrant Responsibility Act of 1996, as amended by the REAL ID Act of 2005, grant the Secretary of Homeland Security the power to "waive all legal requirements such Secretary, in such Secretary's sole discretion, determines necessary to ensure expeditious construction of the barriers and roads" at the border, and limits available review of such determinations. It reads:

"(A) IN GENERAL.—The district courts of the United States shall have exclusive jurisdiction to hear all causes or claims arising from any action undertaken, or any decision made, by the Secretary of Homeland Security pursuant to paragraph (1). A cause of action or claim may only be brought alleging a violation of the Constitution of the United States. The court shall not have jurisdiction to hear any claim not specified in this subparagraph."

— Section 102(c)(2)(A) of the Illegal Immigration Reform and Immigrant Responsibility Act of 1996 (8 U.S.C. 1103 note)

- The Norris–La Guardia Act of 1932 limited the jurisdiction of federal courts to grant prohibitory equitable relief in labor disputes and also rendered yellow-dog contracts void. This effectively abrogated three prior Supreme Court decisions, In re Debs (1895), Adair v. United States (1908), and Coppage v. Kansas (1915), which had legitimated such practices. The act was later upheld by the Supreme Court in Lauf v. E.G. Shinner & Co. (1938) and its primary provision reads:

"No court of the United States, as defined in this Act, shall have jurisdiction to issue any restraining order or temporary or permanent injunction in a case involving or growing out of a labor dispute, except in a strict conformity with the provisions of this Act; nor shall any such restraining order or temporary or permanent injunction be issued contrary to the public policy declared in this Act."

— Section 1 of the Act of Mar. 23, 1932 (29 U.S.C. 101)

- Section 242 of the Immigration and Nationality Act, as overhauled by the Illegal Immigration Reform and Immigrant Responsibility Act of 1996, enacted numerous jurisdiction stripping provisions regarding judicial review of an order of removal. The following provision shown below, known as the section 242 "zipper clause", is but one of these numerous provisions:

"(9) CONSOLIDATION OF QUESTIONS FOR JUDICIAL REVIEW.—Judicial review of all questions of law and fact, including interpretation and application of constitutional and statutory provisions, arising from any action taken or proceeding brought to remove an alien from the United States under this title shall be available only in judicial review of a final order under this section. Except as otherwise provided in this section, no court shall have jurisdiction, by habeas corpus under section 2241 of title 28 or any other habeas corpus provision, by section 1361 or 1651 of such title, or by any other provision of law (statutory or nonstatutory), to review such an order or such questions of law or fact."

— Section 242(b)(9) of the Immigration and Nationality Act of 1952 (8 U.S.C. 1252(b)(9))

- Section 2 of the Portal to Portal Act of 1947 stripped jurisdiction over legal action seeking to recover portal-to-portal compensation, and effectively abrogated the Supreme Court decision in Anderson v. Mt. Clemens Pottery Co. (1946), stating that:

"(d) No court of the United States, of any State, Territory, or possession of the United States, or of the District of Columbia, shall have jurisdiction of any action or proceeding, whether instituted prior to or on or after May 14, 1947, to enforce liability or impose punishment for or on account of the failure of the employer to pay minimum wages or overtime compensation under the Fair Labor Standards Act of 1938, as amended, under the Walsh-Healey Act, or under the Bacon-Davis Act, to the extent that such action or proceeding seeks to enforce any liability or impose any punishment with respect to an activity which was not compensable under subsections (a) and (b) of this section."

— Section 2(d) of the Portal to Portal Act of 1947 (29 U.S.C. 252(d))

- The Gun Lake Trust Land Reaffirmation Act reaffirmed the validity of a 2005 decision by the Secretary of Interior to take a parcel of land into trust on behalf of Match-e-be-nash-she-wish Band of Pottawatomi and also stripped jurisdiction over legal action to contest the land transfer, of which both provisions were upheld in Patchak v. Zinke (2018). The provisions in question are subsections (a) and (b) of section 2, which read as follows:

"(a) IN GENERAL.—The land taken into trust by the United States for the benefit of the Match-E-Be-Nash-She-Wish Band of Pottawatomi Indians and described in the final Notice of Determination of the Department of the Interior (70 Fed. Reg. 25596 (May 13, 2005)) is reaffirmed as trust land, and the actions of the Secretary of the Interior in taking that land into trust are ratified and confirmed.
"(b) NO CLAIMS.—Notwithstanding any other provision of law, an action (including an action pending in a Federal court as of the date of enactment of this Act) relating to the land described in subsection (a) shall not be filed or maintained in a Federal court and shall be promptly dismissed."

— Section 2 of the Gun Lake Trust Land Reaffirmation Act of 2014 (Pub. L. 113-179)

Additionally, there have also been hundreds of unsuccessful bills in Congress to strip federal courts of jurisdiction.

== See also ==
- Ouster clause
- Separation of powers under the United States Constitution
- Supreme Court reform in the United States
