= Patchak v. Zinke =

- Supreme Court of the United States

Argued November 7, 2017 Decided February 27, 2018
- Full case name: David Patchak, Petitioner v. Ryan Zinke, Secretary of the Interior
- Docket no.: 16-498
- Citations: 583 U.S. 244,913 (more) 138 S. Ct. 897; 200 L. Ed. 2d 92; 86 U.S.L.W. 4077
- Argument: Oral argument

Case history
- Prior: Patchak v. Salazar, 646 F. Supp. 2d 72 (D.D.C. 2009); reversed 632 F.3d 702 (D.C. Cir. 2011); cert. granted, 565 U.S. 1092 (2011); affirmed, Match-E-Be-Nash-She-Wish Band of Pottawatomi Indians v. Patchak, 567 U.S. 209 (2012); on remand, Patchak v. Jewell, 109 F. Supp. 3d 152 (D.D.C.); affirmed, 828 F.3d 995 (D.C. Cir. 2016); cert. granted, 137 S. Ct. 2091 (2017).

Holding
- The Gun Lake Trust Land Reaffirmation Act, which precludes federal courts from hearing lawsuits involving a particular parcel of land, does not violate Article III.

Court membership
- Chief Justice John Roberts Associate Justices Anthony Kennedy · Clarence Thomas; Ruth Bader Ginsburg · Stephen Breyer; Samuel Alito · Sonia Sotomayor; Elena Kagan · Neil Gorsuch

Case opinions
- Plurality: Thomas, joined by Breyer, Alito, Kagan
- Concurrence: Breyer
- Concurrence: Ginsburg (in judgment), joined by Sotomayor
- Concurrence: Sotomayor (in judgment)
- Dissent: Roberts, joined by Kennedy, Gorsuch

Patchak v. Zinke, 583 U.S. 244,913 (2018), is a United States Supreme Court case in which the Court upheld the Gun Lake Trust Land Reaffirmation Act, which precludes federal courts from hearing lawsuits involving a particular parcel of land. Although six justices agreed that the Gun Lake Act was constitutional, they could not agree on why. In an opinion issued by Justice Thomas, a plurality of the Court read the statute to strip federal courts of jurisdiction over cases involving the property and held that this did not violate Article Three of the United States Constitution. In contrast, Justices Ginsburg and Sotomayor, both of whom concurred in the judgment, upheld the Act as a restoration of the government's sovereign immunity. Chief Justice Roberts, writing for himself and Justices Kennedy and Gorsuch, dissented on the ground that the statute intruded on the judicial power, in violation of Article III.

== Background ==
=== Legal backdrop ===
The Supreme Court has repeatedly struggled to reconcile Congress's power to alter the metes and bounds of federal court jurisdiction with the judicial power, which Article III vests in the courts alone. Patchak v. Zinke implicated two of these cases in particular:

==== United States v. Klein ====
United States v. Klein, 13 Wall. 128 (1872): During the Civil War, the Treasury Department seized abandoned or captured property in Confederate territory to support the Union. After the War, President Johnson declared that Southerners could receive the proceeds of their confiscated property after receiving a presidential pardon and swearing an oath of loyalty to the United States. Subsequently, in United States v. Padelford, the Supreme Court held that a pardon rendered such claimants "innocent in law as though he had never participated" in the War and, therefore, was entitled to the proceeds. In response, Congress enacted a law providing that a presidential pardon in a suit brought for the proceeds of abandoned or captured property shall be treated as "conclusive evidence" of disloyalty, and, upon such proof, "the jurisdiction of the court in the case shall cease, and the court shall forthwith dismiss the suit of such claimant."

The Court struck down the statute. The Court held that, because Congress "prescribe[d] a rule for the decision of a cause in a particular way", it had "passed the limit which separates the legislative from the judicial power." But the Court also suggested that the law was unconstitutional because it "impair[ed] the effect of a pardon, and thus infring[ed] the constitutional power of the Executive." Thus, while its outcome is clear, the precise holding of Klein has generated much debate.

==== Bank Markazi v. Peterson ====
Bank Markazi v. Peterson, 136 S.Ct. 1310 (2016): Victims and estate representatives sued Iran for its role in the 1983 bombing of the U.S. Marine barracks in Beirut, Lebanon under 28 U.S.C. § 1605A, which provides "money damages... against a foreign state for personal injury or death that was caused by" acts of terrorism. The plaintiffs prevailed in their lawsuit and sought to enforce the judgment against the Central Bank of Iran, known as "Bank Markazi", under the Terrorism Risk Insurance Act, which authorizes the enforcement of judgments obtained under § 1605A against "blocked assets." While the litigation was pending, Congress enacted the Iran Threat Reduction and Syria Human Rights Act of 2012 (codified at 22 U.S.C. § 8772). That statute referenced the litigation by docket number and authorized the Bank's assets to be seized to enforce a judgment pursuant to § 1605A if the court concluded the assets were (1) held in the United States; (2) a "blocked asset"; (3) an asset of Iran; and (4) owned only by Iran.

Relying on Klein, Bank Markazi argued § 8772 violated Article III by "effectively dictat[ing] specific factual findings in connection with a specific litigation—invading the province of the courts." The Supreme Court disagreed. The Court upheld § 8772 on the logic that Congress "does not impinge on judicial power when it directs courts to apply a new legal standard to undisputed facts." Here, the statute "provides a new standard clarifying that, if Iran owns certain assets, the victims of Iran-sponsored terrorist attacks will be permitted to execute against those assets." In upholding the statute, however, the Court cautioned that an Act which merely said "in Smith v. Jones, Smith wins" would violate Article III because it "fails to supply any new legal standard."

Chief Justice Roberts, joined by Justice Sotomayor, dissented, arguing Congress unconstitutionally invaded the judicial power by "enacting a bespoke statute tailored to this case that resolves the parties’ specific legal disputes to guarantee respondents victory."

=== Facts and Procedural History ===
The Match-E-Be-Nash-She-Wish Band of Pottawatomi Indians (also known as the Gun Lake Tribe) live in what is today southwestern Michigan. Despite having been recognized by the federal government in numerous treaties during the 1800s, the Secretary of the Interior did not formally recognize the Band until 1999. Once the Band received recognition, it sought to obtain land to reaffirm its sovereign status. The Tribe identified a 147-acre parcel of land in Wayland Township, Michigan (the Bradley Property) and asked the Secretary of the Interior to take the land into trust under the Indian Reorganization Act (IRA) (codified at 25 U.S.C. § 465). The Secretary agreed in 2005, and the Department of Interior published a notice in the Federal Register announcing the Secretary's intent to take the Bradley Property into trust.

In response, the Michigan Gambling Opposition sued to stop the Secretary. The United States District Court for the District of Columbia dismissed the lawsuit, and the D.C. Circuit affirmed. In 2009, the Secretary took the land into trust. Before the Secretary could do so, however, David Patchak, a resident of Wayland Township, filed a complaint in the United States District Court for the District of Columbia, challenging the Secretary's action under the Administrative Procedure Act (APA) (codified at 5 U.S.C. § 500 et seq.) and the IRA. Specifically, he contended the Secretary lacked authority to take the Bradley Property into trust because the IRA empowers the Secretary to take land into trust only for tribes who were recognized when that law was enacted in 1934, but the Match-E-Be-Nash-She-Wish were not federally recognized until 1999. While Patchak's suit was pending, the Supreme Court embraced this interpretation of the IRA in Carcieri v. Salazar.

The District Court dismissed Patchak's claims, concluding he lacked standing to vindicate violations of the IRA. The D.C. Circuit reversed and also held that the government had waived its sovereign immunity through the APA, which permits claims for prospective, nonmonetary relief. The Supreme Court granted certiorari on both issues. In 2012, the Court affirmed the D.C. Circuit in Match-E-Be-Nash-She-Wish Band of Pottawatomi Indians v. Patchak, holding that Patchak's lawsuit could proceed.

In September 2014, while Patchak's case was again pending before the district court, Congress enacted the Gun Lake Act. That law contained two sections:

- Section 2(a) provides: "The land taken into trust by the United States for the benefit of the Match-E-Be-Nash-She-Wish Band of Pottawatomi Indians and described in the final Notice of Determination of the Department of the Interior (70 Fed. Reg. 25596 (May 13, 2005)) is reaffirmed as trust land, and the actions of the Secretary of the Interior in taking that land into trust are ratified and confirmed."
- Section 2(b) provides: "Notwithstanding any other provision of law, an action (including an action pending in a Federal court as of the date of enactment of this Act) relating to the land described in subsection (a) shall not be filed or maintained in a Federal court and shall be promptly dismissed."

The legislative history of the Act makes clear that Congress acted with the express purpose of "void[ing] a pending lawsuit challenging the lawfullness of the Secretary's original action to acquire the Bradley Property", even mentioning David Patchak by name.

Although Patchak argued the Act was unconstitutional, the district court dismissed his case on the ground that it "lack[ed] jurisdiction to reach the merits of plaintiff's claim." The D.C. Circuit affirmed the District Court's ruling because, "if an action relates to the Bradley Property, it must promptly be dismissed."

The Supreme Court granted certiorari on May 1, 2017.

=== Relevant Constitutional Provisions ===
Section 1, Article III of the U.S. Constitution provides: "The judicial Power of the United States, shall be vested in one supreme Court, and in such inferior Courts as the Congress may from time to time ordain and establish."

== Supreme Court ==
=== Question Presented ===
Does a statute violate the Constitution's separation-of-powers principles if it directs the federal courts to dismiss any pending lawsuit against a particular property but does not amend substantive or procedural laws?

=== Justice Thomas' plurality opinion ===
Writing for a plurality of the Court, Justice Thomas held the Gun Lake Act was a lawful exercise of Congress's legislative authority that did not encroach on the judiciary's Article III powers. He acknowledged that Congress could not pass a statute that says, "In Smith v. Jones, Smith wins", because this would impermissibly withdraw from the courts "the power to interpret and apply the law to the [circumstances] before it." But he went on to observe that Article I entitles Congress to "make laws that apply retroactively to pending lawsuits, even when it effectively ensures that one side wins." Thus, to determine if the Act impermissibly usurps the judiciary's power, the Court had to examine whether it "compels findings or results under old law", or "changes the law." The former is unlawful; the latter is constitutional.

The Gun Lake Act passed this test because it changes the law. The Act's language and its consequences—that actions relating to the Bradley Property "shall be promptly dismissed"—made the law jurisdictional. And laws "that strip jurisdiction change the law for the purpose of Article III." Accordingly, Justice Thomas concluded the Act "is a valid exercise of Congress's legislative power."

Justice Thomas rejected Patchak's arguments that even if the Act is jurisdictional, it nonetheless violated Article III. Regarding Patchak's contention that the Act was unlawful because it "directs" an outcome without having courts interpret new law, Justice Thomas again repeated that the statute "creates new law for suits relating to the Bradley Property." And he dismissed Patchak's attempt to analogize his case to United States v. Klein. Rather, Justice Thomas clarified that the statute in Klein was unconstitutional because Congress could not alter the effect of presidential pardons and therefore "could not achieve the same result by stripping jurisdiction." Thus, this case was unlike Klein because the Gun Lake Act "does not attempt to exercise a power that the Constitution vests in another branch."

Justice Thomas likewise found unpersuasive Patchak's argument that the Act violated Article III because it "attempts to interfere with the Court's decision in Patchak I." Although Congress cannot compel courts to reopen and alter final judgments, Congress does have the power to change the applicable law and direct courts to apply it to pending cases. Thus, Patchak's claim was meritless because his suit was pending when Congress passed the Act. That the Act effectively singled out Patchak's lawsuit was of no moment, Justice Thomas explained, pointing out that Congress targeted specific cases in Bank Markazi v. Peterson by referencing their docket number in the statute.

=== Concurrences ===
==== Justice Breyer's concurrence ====
Justice Breyer joined the plurality in full but also wrote a separate concurrence in which he agreed with Justice Thomas that the Act did not violate Article III. In his view, Section 2(b)'s jurisdiction stripping provision reinforces Section 2(a), in which Congress expressly gave the Secretary authority to take the Bradley Property into trust. Accordingly, Section 2(b) merely "gilds the lily" by "provid[ing] an alternative legal standard for courts to apply that seeks the same real world result as does [Section 2(a)]: The Bradley Property shall remain in trust." To Justice Breyer, Congress' use of its jurisdictional powers to "supplement" Section 2(a)—"action that no one has challenged as unconstitutional"—was "unobjectionable."

==== Justice Ginsburg's concurrence ====
Justice Ginsburg issued an opinion concurring in the judgment for herself and Justice Sotomayor. In her view, the Act was best read as a retraction of the federal government's waiver of sovereign immunity. To be sure, sovereign immunity did not initially preclude Patchak's lawsuit because he sought declaratory and injunctive relief, remedies the APA permits plaintiffs to bring against the federal government. "But consent of the United States to suit may be withdrawn at any time." And that is precisely what the Act achieved, she observed. That is, Congress "displace[d] the APA's waiver of immunity for suits against the United States with a contrary command applicable to the Bradley Property." Accordingly, Justice Ginsburg would have affirmed the D.C. Circuit's opinion without reaching the constitutional questions Patchak raised.

==== Justice Sotomayor's concurrence ====
Justice Sotomayor also wrote an opinion concurring in the judgment. Like Justice Ginsburg, she believed the Act "should not be read to strip the federal courts of jurisdiction but rather to restore the Federal Government's sovereign immunity." She wrote separately to point out the relevance of Match-E-Be-Nash-She-Wish Band of Pottawatomi Indians v. Patchak, which addressed whether sovereign immunity foreclosed Patchak's lawsuit. There, the Court suggested that Congress could reassert its sovereign immunity as a way to end the lawsuit. Justice Sotomayor thus voted to affirm on that "basis alone" and declined to address the separation-of-powers issues.

=== Chief Justice Roberts' dissent ===
Chief Justice Roberts, joined by Justices Kennedy and Gorsuch, dissented from the plurality's ruling. In his view, the Gun Lake Act was indistinguishable from a statue which commanded "In Smith v. Jones, Smith wins." The Chief Justice argued that the Court's precedents, including Klein, demonstrate "Congress violates [Article III] when it arrogates the judicial power to itself and decides a particular case." In his view, the Act ran afoul of that clear rule: It "target[s] a single party for adverse treatment and direct[s] the precise disposition of his pending case." Indeed, he found the Act even more objectionable than the one at issue Bank Markazi v. Peterson. Whereas the statute in Bank Markazi, created a standard for courts to apply in particular cases, the Gun Lake Act "prevents the court from applying any new legal standard", instead mandating dismissal. For that reason, "it is idle to suggest that § 2(b) preserves any role for the court beyond that of stenographer."

The Chief Justice then turned to contest the plurality's analysis. First, the Act was not jurisdictional. The Court, he explained, has "adopted a bright line rule treating statutory limitations as nonjurisdictional unless Congress clearly states otherwise", and here the Act "does not clearly state that it impose a jurisdictional restriction." Second, in his view, the Act does not "change the law." To do so, a statute "must imply some measure of generality or preservation of an adjudicative role for the courts." Here, however, the Act merely strips the courts of jurisdiction over a particular lawsuit.

Finally, he responded to each of the concurrences. He dismissed the position of Justices Ginsburg and Sotomayor that the Act was a restoration of sovereign immunity. To reinstate sovereign immunity, Congress "must express an unambiguous intention to withdraw a remedy." Since the Act did not reference sovereignty or immunity, it did not reflect this clear intent. And with respect to Justice Breyer, the Chief Justice observed, "Congress cannot 'gild the lily' by relieving the Judiciary of its job—applying the law to the case before it."

Thus, the Chief Justice would "hold that Congress exercises the judicial power when it manipulates jurisdictional rules to decide the outcome of a particular pending case" and, consequently, would invalidate the Gun Lake Act.
