= Santa Fe Indian Market =

Annual art fair of Indigenous art

Coordinates: 35°41′14.7474″N 105°56′18.6714″W

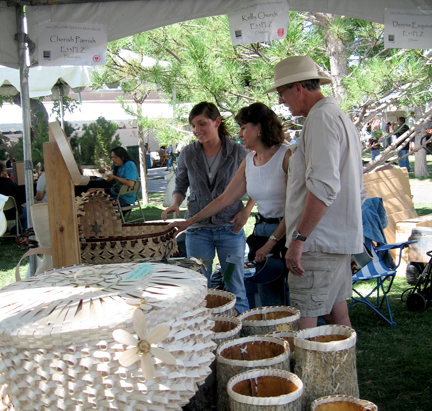
Cherish Parrish (Match-e-be-nash-she-wish Pottawatomi) explains her baskets to visitors at her Santa Fe Indian Market booth

The Santa Fe Indian Market is an annual art market held in Santa Fe, New Mexico on the weekend following the third Thursday in August. The event draws an estimated 150,000 people to the city from around the world. The Southwestern Association for Indian Arts (SWAIA), a nonprofit organization hosts the market, which showcases work by about 1,000 Native American and First Nations artists from Native American tribes and Indigenous nations from coast to coast.

== History ==
=== 1920s ===
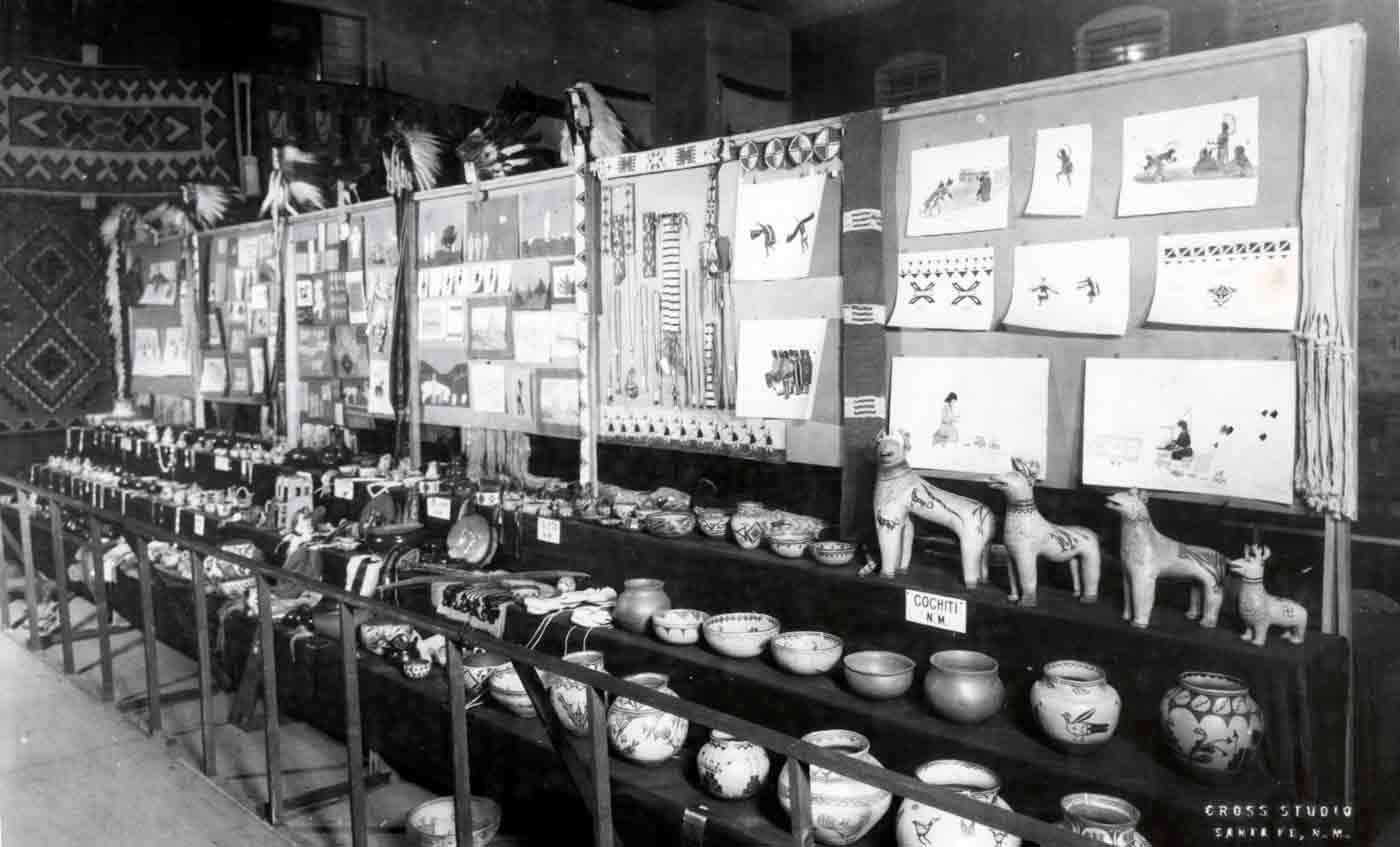
Southwest Indian Fair and Industrial Arts and Crafts Exhibition, 1922, Old Armory Santa Fe (Santa Fe Indian Market)

The first Indian Market, called the annual Southwest Indian Fair and Industrial Arts and Crafts Exhibition, was part of Fiesta de Santa Fe sponsored by the Museum of New Mexico. Kenneth M. Chapman credits art advocate Rose Dougan (life partner of Vera von Blumenthal) for first suggesting the idea of a competitive Native American art fair in 1922 as part of an expanded Santa Fe Fiesta. Edgar L. Hewett, director of the Museum of New Mexico, viewed the early Indian Fair events as part of his efforts for public anthropology. The events were held inside the National Guard Armory with an admission fee charged. Pueblo pottery, Navajo textiles, and Pueblo Flatstyle paintings, such as produced by artists at the Studio and the Santa Fe Indian School, were the primary art forms represented; however, the first place award for best tribal display went to beadwork from Assiniboine and Sioux Tribes of the Fort Peck Indian Reservation in Montana.

Initially, museum staff and later Native artists and educators served as judges, screening work and awarding prizes. Potters themselves were not present for the sale of their works. These early markets were intended to counteract museum and anthropological professionals’ concerns that tourist curio market's demand for pottery was reducing the quality and authenticity of Pueblo pottery.

=== 1930s ===
In 1936, the New Mexico Association on Indian Affairs took over the event. Between 1933 and 1936, events were held at multiple pueblos, rather than in Santa Fe. Maria Chabot returned events to Santa Fe and the NMAIA organized transportation for artists and attached "labels of approval" to the works they believed represented the best works. Today, the Southwestern Association for Indian Arts organizes the market.

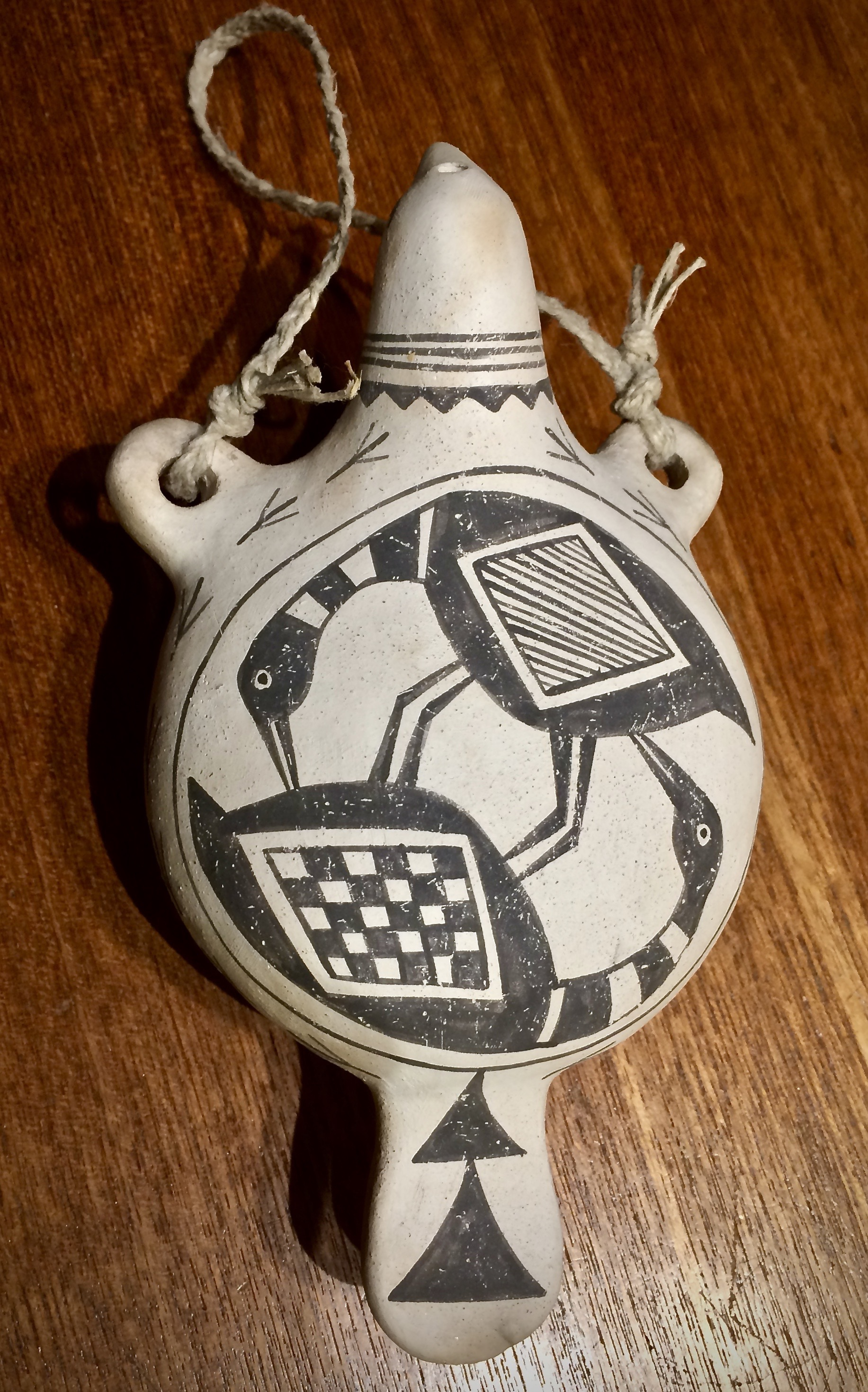
Canteen by market artist Michael Kanteena (Laguna Pueblo)

=== 2020s ===
During the COVID-19 pandemic, the market went virtual for the month of August 2020, under the guidance of executive director Kimberly Peone (Colville Confederated Tribes/Eastern Band Cherokee). The market took place in a hybrid format in 2021, with in-person and virtual events. Only 600 artists were accepted for in-person booths. The remaining 500 artists juried into the market waitlisted and offered opportunities to participate virtually. For the first time, in-person attendance was ticketed rather than free. Santa Fe Indian Market returned to fully in-person operation in August 2022.

== SWAIA leadership ==
Kenneth Chapman helped launched the fair. The first Native American to lead SWAIA was Ramona Sakiestewa (Hopi), a textile artist and designer, who led the organization from 1980 and 1982 for no pay. At the time, SWAIA only had one paid employee and a loaned office at La Fonda on the Plaza. Sakiestewa raised enough funds that her successor finally had a salary.

John Torres Nez, PhD (Diné) was chief operating officer from 2012 to 2014 before resigning and cofounding an alternative art market. Dallin Maybee (Northern Arapaho/Seneca) became interim COO in 2014, then COO until he stepped down in 2018.

Ira Wilson (Diné) served as director from 2018 to 19 Kim Peone (Colville Confederated Tribes/Eastern Band Cherokee) was director from 2020 to 2023. When her contract was terminated, Jaime Schulze (Northern Cheyenne/Sisseton Wahpeton) became interim director in 2023 and permanent director in 2023.

== Featured art ==
The market features pottery, jewelry, textile weavings, painting, sculpture, beadwork, basketry, and other traditional and contemporary work. It is the oldest and largest juried Native American art showcase in the United States. The economic impact of the Market has been calculated at more than $19 million.

Beginning in 2014, the annual market began including a couture runway fashion show event in its programming. The event has grown annually. The 2022 program included two runway shows at the Santa Fe Convention Center with more than 1,000 spectators each night. The shows featured celebrity runway models: Quannah Chasinghorse, Amber Midthunder, Zahn McClarnon, Jessica Matten, Kiowa Gordon, Eugene Brave Rock and D'Pharaoh Woon-A-Tai. The founding director of SWAIA's Indigenous Fashion Show is curator and art historian Amber-Dawn Bear Robe (Siksika Nation.)

== Art standards ==
Artists display their work in booths around the Santa Fe Plaza and adjacent streets, selling directly to the general public. In order to participate, all artists must provide proof of enrollment in one of the federally recognized tribes, and their work must meet strict quality and authentic materials standards. Art experts judge the work and distribute awards and prize money in various categories.

== Contemporary and awards ==
On the evening before the Market's opening, members of SWAIA may attend a preview of representative works by the artists as well as the winners in each category. It is a way for potential buyers to preview the winning artworks and items for sale. Many buyers arrive downtown well before dawn. Collectors used to sleep in the Plaza overnight. It is not unusual for prominent artists to sell out within a few hours.

== See also ==
- Native American art
- List of Native American artists
