= Kelly Church =

Anishaabe artist from Michigan

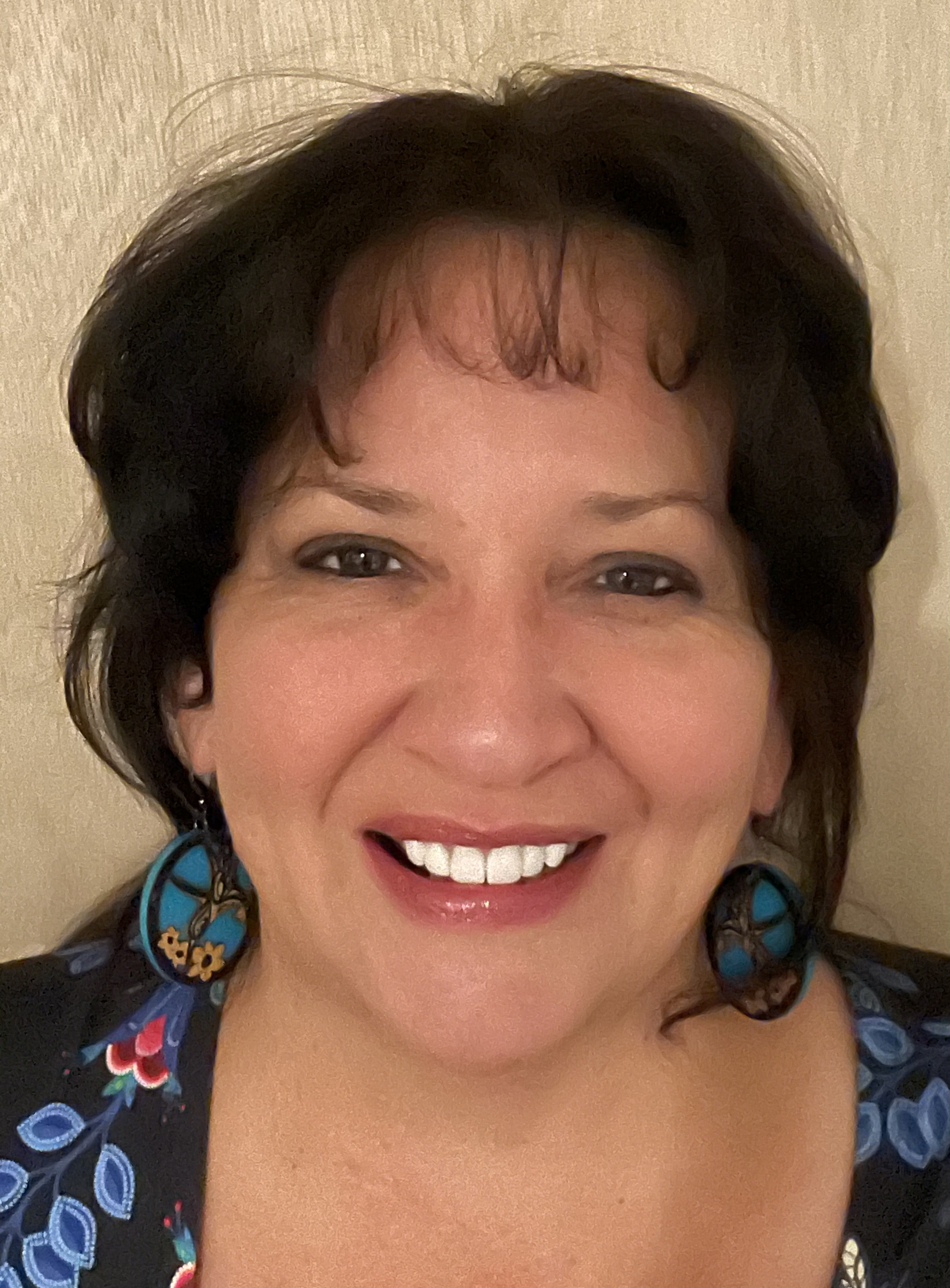
- Church in 2023
- Born: Kelly Jean Church; 1967 (age 58–59); Michigan, U.S.
- Citizenship: Match-e-be-nash-she-wish Band of Pottawatomi Indians of Michigan, American
- Education: Family, self-taught AFA Institute of American Indian Arts; BFA University of Michigan
- Known for: Basket making, painting, birchbark biting
- Movement: Woodlands style
- Awards: NEA National Heritage Fellowship (2018), Michigan Traditional Arts Apprenticeship Award, Southwestern Association for Indian Arts Fellowship
- Website: woodlandarts.com

Kelly Jean Church (Match-e-benash-she-wish Potawatomi/Odawa/Ojibwe) is a black ash basket maker, Woodlands style painter, birchbark biter, and educator. She lives in Michigan.

== Background ==
Kelly Jean Church, a fifth-generation basket maker, was born in 1967. She grew up in southwestern Michigan. Her mother is of English and Irish heritage, and her father is of Potawatomi, Odawa, and Ojibwe heritage. Church studied the Odawa language from her paternal grandmother and learned black ash basketry from her father, Bill Church, and cousin, John Pigeon. She, in turn, has taught her daughter, Cherish Parrish (Gun Lake Band Potawatomi).

Church has completed an AFA degree at the Institute of American Indian Studies and a BFA degree at the University of Michigan.

== Artwork ==
=== Basketry ===
Along with her family, Church harvests her own trees in swampy areas of rural Michigan. Preparing the materials takes far longer than the weaving. She removes the bark from the felled log and then splits apart the growth rings into finer and finer splints for basketry. The splints are dyed and soaked before weaving.

Church's baskets range from utilitarian fishing creels, market baskets, and bark baskets to rectangular wedding baskets and whimsical strawberry baskets. She also creates experimental baskets with her own designs that incorporate materials such as copper, photographs, and plastic window blinds – the latter a warning of what the future might look like without black ash trees. Her work reflects on the potential extinction of the black ash due to the infestation of the emerald ash borer, which is estimated to kill 99 percent of the ash trees in the United States.

=== Birchbark biting ===
Church is an active birchbark biter. This precontact Great Lakes art form involves biting designs with one's eyeteeth into a folded sheet of young paper birch bark. The bit areas turn a dark brown that contrasts with the pale surface of the bark. Her designs are both abstract and representational, featuring turtles, dragonflies, and other subjects. The resulting pieces incorporate storytelling, as well as serving as templates for quillwork and beadwork designs.

=== Painting ===
Inspired by the Woodlands style of painting, also known as Legend or Medicine painting, created by Norval Morrisseau (Bingwi Neyaashi Ojibwe, 1932–2007). Church paints figures from her tribes' oral histories, such as Nanabozho, or the wildlife native to Michigan, such as sandhill cranes. She typically works in acrylic on canvas and uses contrasting colors for maximum optical brilliance.

== Honors and projects ==
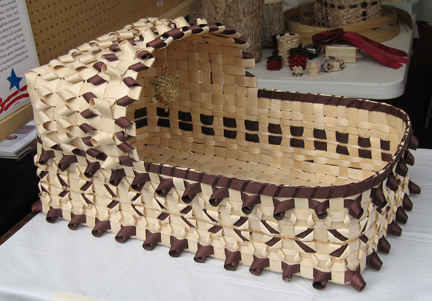
Church's black ash baby basket with sweetgrass turtle charm

Church has won many awards for her basketry, including the Michigan Traditional Arts Apprenticeship Award and the 2008 Southwestern Association for Indian Arts Fellowship. In 2006 and 2008, she organized a symposium about tactics to save the black ash tree from the emerald ash borer, with funding and support from the National Museum of the American Indian. More recently, Church also received the National Museum of the American Indian Artist Leadership Program Award (2010), as well as the Michigan Traditional Arts Apprenticeship Award (2011).

Church was awarded the best of basketry classification by the Southwestern Association for Indian Arts at the Santa Fe Indian Market in 2016. The Smithsonian Institution awarded her a Native Scholars Fellowship in 2016. In addition, she has served as Eiteljorg Artist in Residence, and is a recipient of the Native Arts and Cultures Foundation's National Artist Fellowship.

The National Endowment for the Arts named Church as one of its 2018 National Heritage Fellows. The citation noted her teaching and mentorship work, which "goes beyond the artistic practice to include discussions in biochemistry, forest management, invasive pest control, traditional language skills, and deeply personal memories of family history".

Her work, Sustaining Traditions–Digital Memories, was acquired by the Smithsonian American Art Museum as part of the Renwick Gallery's 50th Anniversary Campaign.

== Selected exhibitions ==
- 7 Artists, 7 Teachings (2009), Mitchell Museum of the American Indian. Artist & curator.
- Before and After the Horizon: Anishinaabe Artists of the Great Lakes (2014), National Museum of the American Indian, New York City facility.
- Gifts of Art (2015), Stamps School of Art and Design, University of Michigan. With fellow alumni Nancy Bulkley.
- Hearts of Our People: Native Women Artists (2019–21), Minneapolis Institute of Art, Frist Art Museum, Renwick Gallery, Philbrook Museum of Art.
- An Interwoven Legacy: The Black Ash Basketry of Kelly Church and Cherish Parrish (2021–22), Grand Rapids Art Museum, Grand Rapids, MI

== See also ==
- List of Indigenous artists of the Americas
- Visual arts of the Indigenous peoples of the Americas
