= Merasty =

Merasty is a surname. Notable people with the surname include:

- Angelique Merasty (1924–1996), Canadian artist
- Billy Merasty (born 1960), Canadian actor and writer
- Gary Merasty (born 1964), Canadian politician
