= Curtailment =

Curtailment may refer to:

- Restricting or limiting civil liberties
- Jurisdiction stripping or curtailment of jurisdiction, Congressional limitation of a court's jurisdiction
- Principal curtailment, reducing the mortgage life by making extra payments
- Travel insurance, coverage of pre-paid expenses due to specific causes for premature termination of travel
- Reduction of energy production due to transmission constraints or insufficient demand
