= Cherish Parrish =

Pottawatomi/Odawa basket maker from Michigan, U.S. (born 1989)

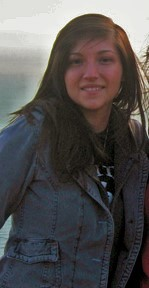
- Born: 1989 (age 36–37)
- Citizenship: Match-e-be-nash-she-wish Band of Pottawatomi Indians of Michigan and American
- Known for: Basket making, birchbark biting
- Website: woodlandarts.com

Cherish Nebeshanze Parrish (born 1989) is a black ash basket maker and birchbark biter. She is a citizen of the Match-e-be-nash-she-wish Band of Pottawatomi Indians of Michigan and of Odawa descent.

Parrish is a sixth generation black ash basket weaver, having learned the craft from her mother, artist Kelly Church.

Parrish was one of the recipients of the Michigan Traditional Arts Apprenticeship Program in 2006. She also participated in the 2006 Smithsonian Folklife Festival as a "Next Generation Weaver". Parrish won best of show in the 2012 Eiteljorg Museum Indian Market, representing the first time a basket had taken the top honor in that show.

Using the pliable bark of black ash trees she harvests from the swamps of the Michigan wetlands, Parrish weaves tightly woven baskets. While she continues the tradition of free form weaving, her work was transformed with the introductions of weaving around a mold. She also creates birchbark bitings in the tradition of the Anishinaabe of Michigan.

Parrish honors women by creating baskets that mimic the shape of women's bodies. Her work The Next Generation—The Carriers of Culture, featured in the 2019 exhibition Hearts of our People, is a black ash basket that replicates the curves of a pregnant woman; the work was described by artist Jonathon Keats as embodying "the unity of utility and beauty by relating basket and belly, while simultaneously suggesting that the future of a people is borne through heritage as much as biology."

== Exhibitions ==
- An Interwoven Legacy: The Black Ash Basketry of Kelly Church and Cherish Parrish (2021–22), Grand Rapids Art Museum, Grand Rapids, MI
- Hearts of our People: Native Women Artists, (2019), Minneapolis Institute of Art, Minneapolis, Minnesota, United States.
