= Wiigwaasabak =

Birch bark scrolls for ceremonial use by the Ojibwa (Anishinaabe) people of North America

Example of a Birch bark scroll piece

A wiigwaasabak (in Anishinaabe syllabics: ᐐᒀᓴᐸᒃ, plural: wiigwaasabakoon ᐐᒀᓴᐸᑰᓐ) is a birch bark scroll, on which the Anishinaabe peoples of North America, including the Ojibweg, wrote with a written language composed of complex geometrical patterns and shapes, perhaps tied to Hand Talk.

When used specifically for Midewiwin ceremonial use, these scrolls are called mide-wiigwaas (in syllabics: ᒥᑌᐐᒀᔅ). These enabled the memorization of complex ideas, and passing along history and stories to succeeding generations. Several such scrolls are in museums, including one on display at the Smithsonian Museum in Washington, DC.

Copper and slate may have also been used, along with hides, pottery, and other artifacts. Some archaeologists are presently trying to determine the exact origins, dates, and locations of their use. Many scrolls were hidden away in caves and man-made pits.

== Construct ==
The bark of the paper birch tree provides an excellent writing material. Usually, a stylus of either bone, metal or wood is used to inscribe these ideographs on the soft inner bark. Black charcoal is often used to fill the scratches to make them easier to see. To form a scroll, pieces of inscribed bark are stitched together using wadab (cedar or spruce roots). To prevent unrolling, the scroll is lashed, then placed in a cylindrically-shaped wiigwaasi-makak (birch bark box) for safe-keeping. Scrolls were recopied after so many years, and stored in dry locations, often underground in special containers, or in caves. Elders recopied the scrolls over time, and some were hidden away in remote areas for safekeeping. Scrolls were often kept hidden to avoid improper interpretations and to avoid ridicule or disrespect of the teachings.

== Purpose ==
Some scrolls are songs and details of Midewiwin rituals and medicine lodges. A map created by an Ojibwe on birchbark was used by Pierre Gaultier de Varennes, sieur de La Vérendrye to follow a route to Grand Portage Bay on Lake Superior in 1731.

Some scrolls give the history of the Ojibway migration from Eastern North America to further west. They indicate the discovery of miigis (white cowrie) shells along their migration through the Great Lakes region. These shells are used in Midewiwin ceremonies, and Whiteshell Provincial Park is named after these kinds of shells that grow in salt water oceans, and not in fresh water, which indicates a large trading and traveling network.

The Ojibwa peoples of the Great Lakes region historically used birch bark to keep records for instructional and guidance purposes. Songs and healing recipes were readable by members of the tribe. Either through engraving or with the use of red and blue pigment, scrolls could contain any number of pictorial representations. Birch bark scrolls could measure anywhere from centimeters to several meters.

The scrolls and traditions are still alive today, and passed along from generation to generation. The Midewiwin are a traditional group that still keeps the scrolls and their teachings alive. There is some secrecy involved to keep the scrolls safe, to interpret them correctly, and to wait until there is more respect for this ancient language system. Scrolls are passed along and the oral teachings that go with them. Complex stories are represented and memorized with the use of the pictures on the scrolls.

There are many claims made by elders and indigenous teachers that humans have existed in North America before the last ice age, and ancient ways of writing and other ancient skills and artifacts may provide some clues to the migration patterns and history of North American and South American peoples.

== Archaeological knowledge ==
Twentieth century archaeology has confirmed that Native Americans have been using birch bark scrolls for over 400 years. In 1965 the archaeologist Kenneth Kidd reported on two finds of "trimmed and fashioned pieces of birch bark on which have been scratched figures of animals, birds, men, legendary creatures, and esoteric symbols" in the Head-of-the-Lakes region of Ontario. Some of these resembled scrolls used by the Mide Society of the Ojibwa.

Kidd concluded "These two finds of 'birch bark scrolls' and associated artifacts indicates that Indians of this region occasionally deposited such artifacts in out-of-the-way places in the woods, either by burying them or by secreting them in caves. The period or periods at which this was done is far from clear. But in any event, archaeologists should be aware of the custom and not overlook the possibility of their discovery."

Another scroll from a different collection was later dated to about 1560, +/-70 years.

== See also ==
- Birch bark document, ancient and medieval documents from Eurasia

- The Red Man's Rebuke (1892), birchbark booklet by Simon Pokagon (Potawatomi)

- jiimaan, birchbark canoe
- maniwiigwaasekomaan, knife for harvesting birchbark
- mazinibaganjigan, birchbark artform created by biting a design into birchbark
- Midewiwin
- Wigwam, typically made using birch bark
- wiigwaasi-makak, birchbark boxes
- wiigwaas-onaagan, dishes and trays made of birchbark
- Petroforms
- Petroglyphs
- Rock Art
