= Match-E-Be-Nash-She-Wish =

Potawatomi chief

Match-E-Be-Nash-She-Wish (also spelled with various transliterations as Mashipinashiwish, Me-chee-pee-nai-she-insh, Mash-i-pi-wish , Mitch-e-pe-nain-she-wish, or Mat-che-pee-na-che-wish) was a hereditary chief of a Potawatomi Indian group in what is now Michigan. The Potawatomi are one of the peoples of the Council of Three Fires; the others are the Odawa and the Ojibwe, all Algonquian-language speakers.

== Post-American Revolution activities ==
Listed by the United States by English name of Bad Bird and as an Ojibwe, the chief made his sign on the Treaty of Greenville, in 1795, which ended the Northwest Indian War after the defeat of the Western Confederacy. (The Ojibwe were closely allied with the Potawatomi and Ottawa in the Council of Three Fires). This treaty was signed by chiefs of those three tribes and others that had been part of the Western Confederacy. The bands ceded considerable territory in present-day Ohio, Indiana and Illinois, allowing settlement by European Americans in what the U.S. called the Northwest Territory, an area north of the Ohio River and east of the Mississippi.

The 1821 Treaty of Chicago, which Match-E-Be-Nash-She-Wish signed on August 29, 1821, there listed as an Ottawa, reserved a three mile-square tract for an Indian village at the head of the Kalamazoo River (spelled then as Kekalamazoo). The present-day city of Kalamazoo developed at this site.

Bad Bird was identified as signing the US Treaty with the Potawatomi, of September 19, 1827, by which he ceded the Kalamazoo tract reserved for the Indian village to the U.S. He did not sign the 1828 Treaty with the Potawatomi, which ceded additional land in southwest Michigan to the U.S. He did sign the 1832 U.S. Treaty with the Potawatomi, which also ceded additional land in the area.

The Dictionary of Canadian Biography Online estimates that Match-E-Be-Nash-She-Wish (Bad Bird) was born about 1735 and died about 1805. It does not attest to his signing the treaties from 1821 to 1832 with the United States. The dates suggest that perhaps a younger man of the same name signed these treaties.

The federally recognized tribe in the United States known as the Match-E-Be-Nash-She-Wish Band of Pottawatomi (formerly known as the Gun Lake Band) is based in Dorr, Michigan in Allegan County. They renamed their tribe after this chief, as its members trace their descent from him and his wife.
