= Anderson v. Mt. Clemens Pottery Co. =

- Supreme Court of the United States

Argued January 29, 1946 Decided June 10, 1946
- Full case name: Anderson, et al. v. Mt. Clemens Pottery Co.
- Citations: 328 U.S. 680 (more) 66 S. Ct. 1187; 90 L. Ed. 1515; 1946 U.S. LEXIS 3065; 11 Lab. Cas. (CCH) ¶ 51,233

Case history
- Prior: Anderson v. Mt. Clemens Pottery Co., 60 F. Supp. 146 (E.D. Mich. 1943); reversed, Mt. Clemens Pottery Co. v. Anderson, 149 F.2d 461 (6th Cir. 1945); cert. granted, 326 U.S. 706 (1945).
- Subsequent: Petition for rehearing denied, 329 U.S. 822 (1946).

Holding
- Preliminary work activities, if controlled by the employer and performed entirely for the employer's benefit, are properly included in the statutory workweek under Fair Labor Standards Act.

Court membership
- Chief Justice vacant Associate Justices Hugo Black · Stanley F. Reed; Felix Frankfurter · William O. Douglas; Frank Murphy · Robert H. Jackson; Wiley B. Rutledge · Harold H. Burton

Case opinions
- Majority: Murphy, joined by Black, Reed, Douglas, Rutledge
- Dissent: Burton, joined by Frankfurter
- Jackson took no part in the consideration or decision of the case.

Laws applied
- Fair Labor Standards Act
- Abrogated by
- Portal-to-Portal Act of 1947

Anderson v. Mt. Clemens Pottery Co., 328 U.S. 680 (1946), is a decision by the US Supreme Court that held that preliminary work activities, if controlled by the employer and performed entirely for the employer's benefit, are properly included as working time under the Fair Labor Standards Act. The decision is known as the "portal to portal case."

The Supreme Court reaffirmed Anderson v. Mt. Clemens Pottery in its 2016 ruling in Tyson Foods, Inc. v. Bouaphakeo, No. 14-1146 (March 22, 2016).

== Background ==
The United States Congress passed the Fair Labor Standards Act (FLSA) in 1938. Section 7(a) of the Act defined working time, and required employers to pay overtime wages under certain circumstances. Section 11(c) of the Act requires employers to keep accurate records regarding time on the job. Section 16(b) of the Act enables employees to sue to recover lost wages.

About 1,200 workers at the Mt. Clemens Pottery Co. facility in Mount Clemens, Michigan, were employed at a large, 8-acre (32,000 m^{2}) facility. The plant was nearly a quarter-mile in length. The employees' entrance was in the northeast corner.

Employees were given 14 minutes between each shift to punch the time clock, walk to their respective workbench and prepare for work. It took a minimum of eight minutes for all the employees to get by the time clock. The estimated walking time for employees ranged from 30 seconds to three minutes, but some workers needed as many as eight minutes to reach their workbenches. Upon arriving at their workbench, employees were required to put on aprons or overalls, removed shirts, tape or grease arms, put on finger cots, prepare equipment, turn on switches, open windows, and/or assemble or sharpen tools. Such preparatory activities consumed three to four minutes.

Working time was calculated by the employer based on the time cards punched by the clocks. The employer deducted walking and preparatory time from the time cards based on the punched time and assumptions about how long prep work and walking would take on average.

Seven employees and their labor union (represented by Edward Lamb) brought a class action suit under Section 16(b) of the FLSA alleging that the employer's calculations did not accurately reflect the time actually worked and that they were deprived of the proper amount of overtime compensation.

=== Special master's findings ===
The district court appointed a special master to investigate the case. The special master recommended that the case be dismissed because the employees did not establish by a preponderance of evidence a violation of the Act. The special master concluded that walking time was not traditionally held to be compensable working time in the industry, that the employees had produced no reliable evidence to determine how much time they had lost, and that the employees had not shown that they were forced to wait until starting time.

=== District court's ruling ===
The district court agreed, with one exception. The court found that the vast majority of employees were ready for work approximately five minutes before the start of work and that it seemed unreasonable that employees would not begin work as they were paid by piece rate. The court fashioned a formula for computing which employees were forced to wait. The district court then entered a judgment against Mt. Clemens Pottery Co. in the amount of $2,415.74.

=== Court of appeals' ruling ===
The Sixth Circuit Court of Appeals upheld the district court in part, and overruled the district court in part. The court of appeals upheld the district court and special master by concluding that the employees' claims were not supported by the evidence. However, the court of appeals ruled the district court had erred by assuming that work would begin before the official start of working time. The court of appeals further held that the burden rested upon the employees to prove by a preponderance of the evidence that they did not receive the wages to which they were entitled.

The workers appealed to the Supreme Court, which granted certiorari.

== Holding ==
Justice Frank Murphy issued the opinion of the Court. The majority held that the court of appeals and the special master had imposed an improper standard of proof on the employees. Section 11(c) of the Act imposed upon the employer, not the worker, the duty to keep proper records of wages, hours and other conditions and practices of employment. Where the employer has failed to keep accurate or adequate records, Justice Murphy argued, the law does not deny recovery on the ground that the employee is unable to prove the precise extent of uncompensated work. Such a ruling, Murphy noted, would create a strong disincentive for employers to keep any records at all and shift the burden back onto the employee. Thus, Murphy concluded that "an employee has carried out his burden if he proves that he has in fact performed work for which he was improperly compensated and if he produces sufficient evidence to show the amount and extent of that work as a matter of just and reasonable inference."

The employer may rebut such claims by producing accurate and adequate records that document the actual work performed. In the absence of such rebutting evidence, the court may award damages to the employee, even though the award is only approximate.

Justice Murphy subsequently turned to the facts of the case. On the basis of the factual record, which proved decisive in the case, the court found that work had, in fact, begun and ended at the scheduled hours and that the employees had no basis for a claim in this regard. The court did not find that the time clock evidence was reliable. "[Time] clocks do not necessarily record the actual time worked by employees," Murphy wrote. Since it took eight minutes for an entire shift to punch in, it would be unfair to credit the first worker in line for eight minutes of work, and the time clocks did not show the time at which employees were compelled to be on the premises or at their workbenches.

But the majority held that the employer required workers to be on the premises prior and subsequent to the scheduled working hours. Some of this time was clearly spent on work such as preparatory activities such as putting on aprons, sharpening tools and turning on machinery.

Murphy dismissed arguments against vagueness in determining the compensatory award by advocating a de minimis approach. Did the district court need to determine, down to the second, how much time was spent working? He thought not: "Split-second absurdities are not justified by the actualities of working conditions or by the policy of the Fair Labor Standards Act." Murphy reasoned, however, that the evidence clearly showed that workers did spend a "substantial measure" of time engaged in prep work. This time could be gauged under a de minimis rule, and a satisfactory award fashioned.

The majority remanded the case to the district court and ordered that the court determine how much time (on average) was spent walking and how much time doing preparatory activities and to fashion an award based only the amount of time engaged in preparatory activity.

=== Dissent ===
Justice Harold Hitz Burton dissented, joined by Justice Felix Frankfurter. Justice Burton argued that Rule 53(e)(2) of the Federal Rules of Civil Procedure required the court to accept the special master's findings of fact unless clearly erroneous. Burton pointed out that the majority had accepted the special master's findings of fact. How, then, could the court reject the master's findings regarding prep time?

Burton also observed that, under the majority's de minimis rule, the employees would receive no award. Burton noted that employees had admitted that as little as one minute was spent in preparatory work. Under the de minimis rule, almost no workers had a claim.

Burton also argued that Congress had never intended to redefine the term "workweek" in the Act. Preparatory work was customarily not paid overtime but included in the rate of pay, Burton said. But the majority's ruling rested in a radical redefinition of the term "workweek," Burton claimed.

There is no evidence that Congress meant to redefine this common term and to set aside long established contracts or customs which had absorbed in the rate of pay of the respective jobs recognition of whatever preliminary activities might be required of the worker by that particular job.... "Workweek" is a simple term used by Congress in accordance with the common understanding of it. For this Court to include in it items that have been customarily and generally absorbed in the rate of pay but excluded from measured working time is not justified in the absence of affirmative legislative action.

Burton would have affirmed the judgment of the court of appeals.

== Aftermath ==
In 1947, Congress enacted the Portal to Portal Act of 1947 to amend the Fair Labor Standards Act in light of the court's ruling in Anderson v. Mt Clemens Pottery Co. The word "portal" refers to the workplace door, so "Portal-to-Portal" could be interpreted to mean that all time spent within that door is work time. However, Section 4 of the 1947 Act required that the determination of whether time spent in preliminary or postliminary activities was "work" under the FLSA was to be based solely on contract, custom, or practice.

Unfortunately, the Portal-to-Portal Act was equally unclear as to what constituted contract, custom or practice. The Supreme Court attempted to clarify the issue in Steiner v. Mitchell, 350 U.S. 247 (1956), by ruling that activities which were "integral" to work (such as the donning of protective clothing) were compensable under the FLSA and Portal-to-Portal Act.

Nearly 50 years later, the Court again revisited the issue of what constituted "work." In IBP, Inc. v. Alvarez, the Court again engaged in a fact-specific analysis to conclude that time spent waiting while in protective gear, or time spent walking in protective gear, was compensable working time.

The Supreme Court reaffirmed Anderson v. Mt. Clemens Pottery in its 2016 ruling in Tyson Foods v. Bouaphakeo, No. 14-1146 (March 22, 2016). Justice Anthony Kennedy, writing for the 6-to-2 majority, quoted from Anderson v. Mt. Clemens Pottery in affirming the right of pork processing plant workers in using statistics to support their back-wage claims for time spent in donning protective clothing and equipment while at work.

== See also ==
- List of United States Supreme Court cases, volume 328
