= Birchbark biting =

Indigenous Great Lakes art form

Birchbark biting (Ojibwe: Mazinibaganjigan, plural: mazinibaganjiganan) is an Indigenous artform made by Anishinaabeg, including Ojibwe people, Potawatomi, and Odawa, as well as Cree and other Algonquian peoples of the Subarctic and Great Lakes regions of Canada and the United States. Artists bite on small pieces of folded birch bark to form intricate designs.

Indigenous artists used birchbark biting for entertaining in storytelling and to create patterns for quillwork and other art forms.

In the 17th century, Jesuits sent samples of this artform to Europe, where it had been previously unknown. The practice remained common in Saskatchewan into the 1950s.

== Name ==
Birchbark biting is also known as mazinashkwemaganjigan(-an) (by Northwestern Ontario Ojibwe) and njigan(-an) (by Wisconsin Ojibwe). In English, this has been described either as "birch bark bitings" or "birch bark transparencies."

== Process ==
Artists chose thin and flexible pieces of birch bark. This kind of bark is easiest to find in the early spring. Using the eyeteeth to bite, the bite pressures can either pierce the bark pieces into a lace or just make certain areas thinner to allow for light to pass through. If the bark piece is carefully folded, symmetrical designs can also be made onto it.

== Uses ==
Many of the designs that are used contain symbolic and religious significance to the Ojibwe and other tribes. Though the practice almost died out, an estimated dozen practitioners are active in Canada and the United States, some of whom display the craft in contexts outside of their original intentions to show evidence of this ancient practice. Birchbark bitings can be used in storytelling, as patterns for quillwork and beadwork, as well as finished pieces of art. The holes created by biting are sometimes filled with coloured threads to create woven designs.

== See also ==
- Kelly Church, contemporary Potawatomi/Odawa/Ojibwe birchbark biter and black ash basket maker
- Angelique Merasty (Woodland Cree, 1924–1996), birchbark biting artist
- Wiigwaasabak: birch bark scrolls
- jiimaan: Canoe typically made using birch bark
- maniwiigwaasekomaan: Knife for harvesting birch bark
- wiigiwaam: Wigwam, typically made using birch bark
- wiigwaasi-makak: boxes and other containers made of birch bark
- wiigwaas-onaagan: dishes and trays made of birch bark
- Papercutting
