= Michael Kanteena =

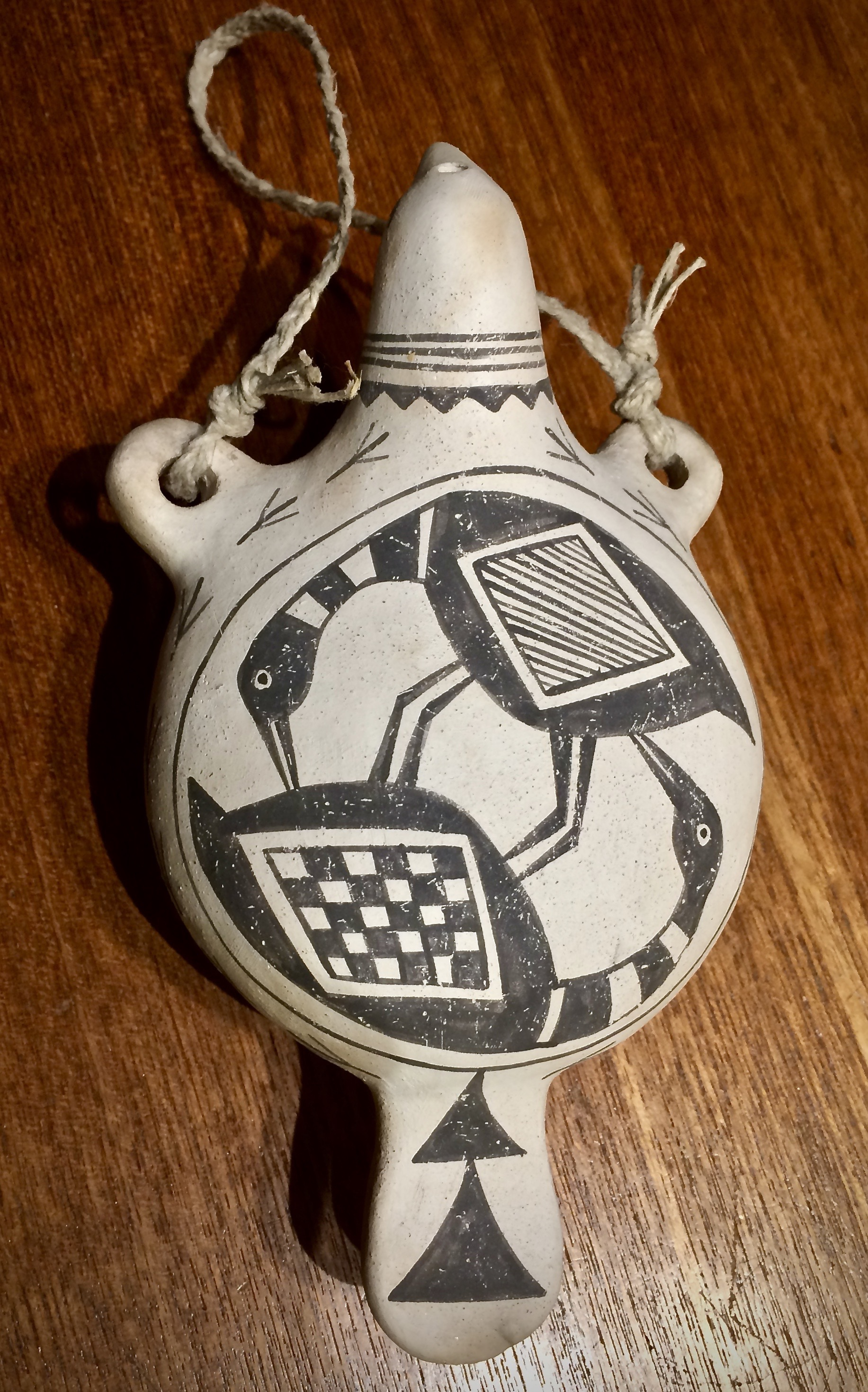
Laguna canteen with Mimbres design by Michael Kanteena

Michael Kanteena (born September 1, 1959) is a potter from Laguna Pueblo, New Mexico. He is best known for his pottery inspired by Chaco, Mesa Verde and other Ancestral Pueblo pottery. Kanteena also makes pottery inspired by historic kachina dolls and kachina masks. His work has been displayed in the Maxwell Museum in Albuquerque, the Wheelwright Museum in Santa Fe, and at many commercial galleries. Kanteena also shows his work at the annual Santa Fe Indian Market.

Kanteena earned a bachelor's degree in Fine Arts from Eastern New Mexico University in 1981. He lives and works in Laguna, New Mexico. He has taught pottery-making at the Crow Canyon Archaeological Center in southwest Colorado.

== Honors and awards ==
- New Mexico State Fair, first place award, 1994
- Gallup Ceremonial: first, second and third place awards, 1995; first place award, 1996
- Wingspread Collectors' Guide Award of Excellence, 1998
- Feature article in the January, 2001 issue of New Mexico Magazine

== See also ==
- Native American pottery
- Ancestral Puebloans
