= Gun Lake Trust Land Reaffirmation Act =

American law

- Long title: An Act to reaffirm that certain land has been taken into trust for the benefit of the Match-E-Be-Nash-She-Wish Band of Pottawatami Indians, and for other purposes
- Enacted by: the 113th United States Congress

Citations
- Public law: 113-179
- Statutes at Large: 128 Stat. 1913

Legislative history
- Introduced in the Senate by Debbie Stabenow (D–MI) on October 29, 2013; Committee consideration by United States Senate Committee on Indian Affairs; Passed the Senate on June 19, 2014 (unanimous consent); Passed the House of Representatives on September 16, 2014 (359-64); Signed into law by President Barack Obama on September 26, 2014

United States Supreme Court cases
- Patchak v. Zinke

The Gun Lake Trust Land Reaffirmation Act (S. 1603) is an act of Congress that reaffirmed the status of lands taken into trust by the Department of the Interior (DOI) for the benefit of the Match-E-Be-Nash-She-Wish Band of Pottawatomi Indians in the state of Michigan.

The bill was introduced and passed during the 113th United States Congress and became federal law on September 26, 2014 when signed by President Barack Obama. In 2018, the Supreme Court of the United States affirmed the law's constitutionality in Patchak v. Zinke.

== Background ==
In 2009, the Supreme Court held in Carcieri v. Salazar that the term "now under Federal jurisdiction" referred only to tribes that were federally recognized when the Indian Reorganization Act became law, and the federal government could not take land into trust from tribes that were recognized after 1934. This act clarified that the Match-E-Be-Nash-She-Wish Band's land trust could not be challenged in court under the Carcieri decision.

== Provisions of the bill ==
This summary is based largely on the summary provided by the Congressional Research Service, a public domain source.

The Gun Lake Trust Land Reaffirmation Act ratifies and confirms the actions of the Secretary of the Interior in taking specified land into trust for the benefit of the Match-E-Be-Nash-She-Wish Band of Pottawatomi Indians.

The act reaffirms that land as trust land.

The act prohibits an action relating to that land from being filed or maintained in a federal court.

== Congressional Budget Office report ==
This summary is based largely on the summary provided by the Congressional Budget Office, as ordered reported by the Senate Committee on Indian Affairs on May 21, 2014. This is a public domain source.

S. 1603 reaffirms the status of lands taken into trust by the Department of the Interior (DOI) for the benefit of the Match-E-Be-Nash-She-Wish Band of Pottawatomi Indians in the state of Michigan. The legislation also prohibits any lawsuits related to the trust land. In 2012, the Supreme Court ruled that DOI lacked the authority to take nearly 150 acres into trust.

Based on information provided by DOI, the Congressional Budget Office (CBO) estimated that implementing the legislation would have no significant effect on the federal budget. The legislation would not significantly increase the cost of managing tribal trust lands. The act would not affect direct spending or revenues; therefore, pay-as-you-go procedures do not apply.

The act contains an intergovernmental and private-sector mandate as defined in the Unfunded Mandates Reform Act (UMRA) because it ends rights of action for public and private entities that are currently able to pursue legal actions related to the land held in trust for the Match-E-Be-Nash-She-Wish Band of Pottawatomi Indians. The act prohibits any action relating to the trust land from being brought or maintained in a federal court. The cost of the mandate would be any forgone compensation that would have been awarded through legal actions.

The state of Michigan and several local governments have entered into an agreement with the tribe related to the use of the land, and CBO believes it is unlikely that, without the act, any other public entity would bring an action that would result in significant compensation. Therefore, CBO estimated the cost of the intergovernmental mandate would not exceed the annual threshold established in UMRA for such mandates ($76 million, in 2014, adjusted annually for inflation).

Private entities, however, have no such agreement, and the bill would extinguish all rights to legal actions relating to the trust lands. Awards in such claims are in many cases limited to the value of the land. Because of the commercial properties located on the trust land, the value of awards related to those lands could be significant. However, because both the number of claims that could be barred or terminated and the value of forgone compensation stemming from those claims were uncertain, CBO had no basis for estimating the cost of the mandate. Therefore, CBO could not determine whether the cost of the private-sector mandate would exceed the annual threshold established in UMRA for such mandates ($152 million, in 2014, adjusted annually for inflation).

== Procedural history ==
The Gun Lake Trust Land Reaffirmation Act was introduced into the United States Senate on October 29, 2013 by Sen. Debbie Stabenow (D, MI). The bill was referred to the United States Senate Committee on Indian Affairs. The committee held a hearing about the bill on May 7, 2014. On June 19, 2014, the Senate voted to pass the bill with unanimous consent. On September 16, 2014, the House of Representatives voted 359-64 to pass the bill. President Barack Obama signed the bill into law on September 26, 2014.

== See also ==
- Patchak v. Zinke: U.S. Supreme Court case finding the law to be constitutional
- List of bills in the 113th United States Congress
