= Watap =

Type of thread

Watap, watape, wattap, or wadab (/wəˈtɑːp/ or /wæˈtɑːp/) is the thread and cordage used by the Native Americans and First Nations peoples of Canada to sew together sheets and panels of birchbark. The word itself comes from the Algonquian language family, but watap cordage was used and sewn by all of the people who lived where the paper birch tree grows. The cordage was usually manufactured from the roots of various species of conifers, such as the white spruce, black spruce, or Northern whitecedar, but could originate from a variety of species that sprouted root fibers with sufficient tensile strength for the required purpose. In a typical manufacturing process, the roots would be debarked, subjected to a lengthy soaking process, and then steamed or boiled to render them pliable for sewing. The roots could be left whole and used as cords, or divided into smaller fibers for twine.

== Uses ==
Sewn birchbark panels were employed by the native North Americans of the Upper Great Lakes for a wide variety of purposes; the best-known, and one which required among the highest degree of craftsmanship, was the manufacture of light canoes. Panels of bark, sewn together with watap and caulked with tree resin, could be used to create a vessel that would resist leakage to the point of being almost waterproof. The watap could also be used as part of the joinery for the structural elements of the canoe.

Watap-sewn bark sheets and panels could also be used to make vessels and utensils for food storage and other household use. Examples of this packaging were called wiigwaasi-makakoon, and the watap stitchery was often used as an element in the decoration and unique identity of the package. The peoples initiated into the heritage of the Midewiwin, or Great Medicine Society, kept records and aids to memory through birchbark scrolls sewn together with watap.

== Linguistic heritage ==
The word "watap" entered European languages through Canadian French, and ultimately derives from the Cree word watapiy. The wide use of the term in Cree indicates the importance of birchbark craft to that nation and the widespread presence of the paper birch and spruce in their historical homeland. The Anishinaabe peoples also extensively harvested and manufactured watap.

== Geography ==
Watap Lake, also called Watape Lake, and the adjacent Watap Portage are key elements in the Grand Portage from Lake Superior to the interior of North America. The lake and portage were of such historical importance that the boundary between Canada and the United States of America follows the length of the lake and portage today.

Watab River in Stearns County, Minnesota, served as a boundary separating the Dakota peoples from the Ojibwa people per the 1825 First Treaty of Prairie du Chien.

== See also ==
- wiigob: bast cordage made from basswood (Tilia spp.))
