= Edward Lamb =

American lawyer

Lamb in 1946

Edward Lamb (April 23, 1901 – March 23, 1987) was an American businessman, broadcasting executive and labor lawyer. He is best known for having defended striking workers during the Auto-Lite Strike in 1934 and for successfully resisting the federal government's attempt to strip him of his broadcasting licenses during the McCarthy era.

== Background ==
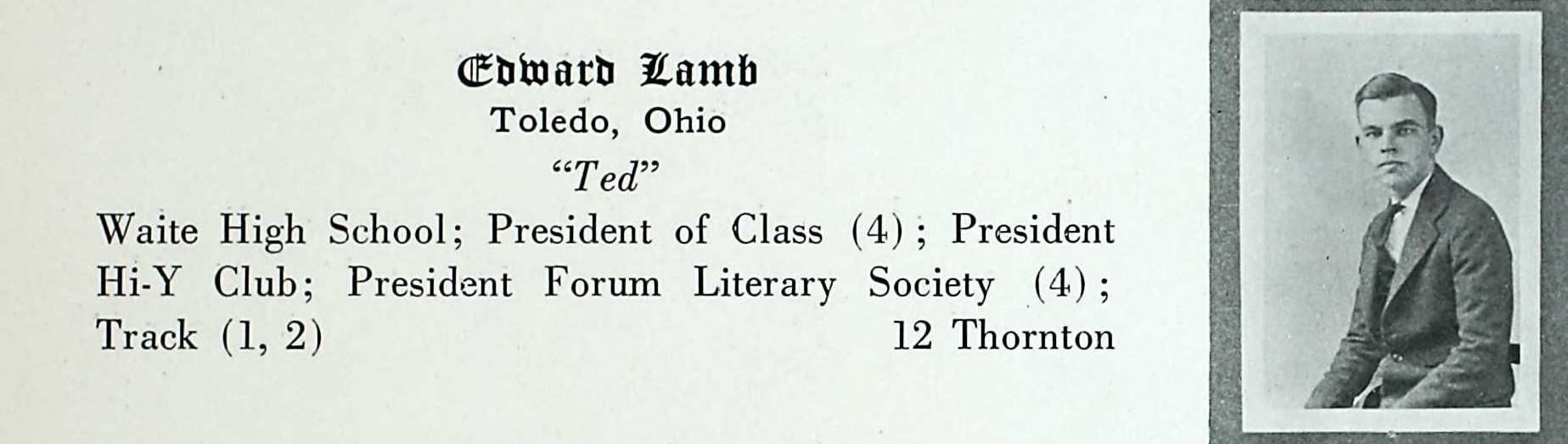
Lamb in the Dartmouth College yearbook, 1924

Lamb was born to British-born Clarence and Mary (Gross) Lamb in 1901 in Toledo, Ohio. He was one of ten children. Clarence Lamb was a commercial fisherman on Lake Erie, and Mary Lamb a housekeeper.

Lamb entered Dartmouth College in 1920. He received a juris doctor degree from Western Reserve University (now Case Western Reserve University) in 1927. He was admitted to the Ohio bar the same year.

== Career ==
=== Government ===
In 1928, he became assistant counsel for the city of Toledo. He quit public life in 1929 and opened a private practice.

=== Labor lawyer ===
In 1934, Lamb turned from corporate to labor law after workers at the Auto-Lite auto parts manufacturer asked him to represent them during the Auto-Lite Strike. "I knew it would finish me with the corporations I represented, but those workers were in the right and I took their case." Lamb became deeply involved in the negotiations which ended the violent Auto-Lite strike, and helped to successfully negotiate a collective bargaining agreement.

Lamb remained active in labor law through the 1930s and 1940s, representing more than 75 unions. He was jailed several times for contempt of court during labor union strikes. Other notable instances where Lamb represented workers were the "onion fields strike" in McGuffey, Ohio, in 1934; the Little Steel Strike in Ohio in 1937; the shoe workers' strike in Portsmouth, Ohio, in 1937; and the strike against the U.S. Gypsum Company in Port Clinton, Ohio, in 1938. During the shoe workers' strike, corporate attorneys initiated disbarment proceedings against Lamb for his aggressive defense of trade union members. The disbarment proceeding was unsuccessful.

Lamb won a landmark U.S. Supreme Court case in 1946. In Anderson v. Mt. Clemens Pottery Co., 328 U.S. 680 (1946), the Supreme Court held that workers were entitled to pay for required preliminary duties after arriving at the places of work, if the employer made them wait before and after the shift periods, and for time spent in walking from time clocks to their places of work. The decision subsequently became known as the "portal to portal case."

=== Associations ===
In the 1930s, Lamb was a member of the International Juridical Association.

=== Broadcasting ===
Increasingly wealthy from a series of stock investments, Lamb began buying newspapers and television and radio stations in the 1940s. Picture Waves, Inc., a Lamb-owned affiliate, was awarded the license for WTVN-TV (now WSYX) in Columbus, Ohio and the station began broadcasting in 1949. He also owned several media interests in Erie, Pennsylvania; including the now-defunct Erie Dispatch Herald newspaper and WICU-AM-TV. He nearly lost his Erie stations in a bitter legal battle with the Federal Communications Commission (FCC). When the station's license came up for renewal in 1954, the FCC tried to get Lamb to surrender his broadcasting license on grounds that he associated with communists. Lamb fought for the right to hold the license, and won his case in 1957.

=== Investments ===
Lamb also owned more than 55 manufacturing and financial concerns (including Nevada National Bancorporation, later part of Security Pacific Bank). One of his largest businesses was the Seiberling Rubber Co. Lamb fought a losing proxy fight for control over the company in 1956, but seized control after another shareholder battle in 1962.

=== Trustee ===
In his later years, Lamb was a trustee of the United Nations Association chapter in the United States, and participated in peace and civil rights demonstrations in the 1960s. He was also a trustee of the Fund for the Republic, a civil rights organization which was absorbed by the Center for the Study of Democratic Institutions in 1979. He was one of the signers of the Humanist Manifesto.

Lamb's company changed its name to Great Lakes Communications after selling off all of his interests outside of Erie. He continued to serve as president and chairman until his death in 1987.

== Personal and death ==
Lamb and his wife, Prudence had two children: Priscilla Lamb Schwier and Edward Lamb.

He died aged 85 on March 23, 1987, at his home in Maumee, Ohio.

== Legacy ==
His wife and children survived him, and continued to operate WICU-TV until selling it in 1996. His estate endowed the Edward Lamb Foundation of Maumee, Ohio (also listed as Perrysburg, Ohio).

== External sources ==
- Bernstein, Irving. The Turbulent Years: A History of the American Worker, 1933-1941. Paperback edition. Boston: Houghton-Mifflin Co., 1970. ISBN 0-395-11778-X (Originally published 1969.)
- Brown, Jr., Ralph S. "Character and Candor Requirements for FCC Licensees." Law and Contemporary Problems. 22:4 (Autumn 1957).
- "Edward Lamb." The Nation. April 1987.
- "Edward Lamb is Dead at 84; Millionaire and Labor Lawyer." New York Times. March 25, 1987.
- French, Michael. "Structure, Personality, and Business Strategy in the U.S. Tire Industry: The Seiberling Rubber Company, 1922-1964." Business History Review. 67:3 (Summer 1993).
- "Innocent Lamb?" Time. November 29, 1954.
- Kelly, Frank K. Court of Reason: Robert Hutchins and the Fund for the Republic. New York: The Free Press, 1981. ISBN 0-02-918030-9
- Lamb, Edward. No Lamb for Slaughter. New York: Harcourt, Brace World, 1963.
- Lamb, Edward. Trial By Battle: The Case History of a Washington Witch-Hunt. Santa Barbara, Calif.: Center for the Study of Democratic Institutions, 1964.
- Reeves, Thomas C. Freedom and the Foundation: The Fund for the Republic in the Era of McCarthyism. New York: Alfred A. Knopf, 1969.
- "Shorn Lamb." Time. May 7, 1956.
- Chapman, Roger. "American Progressivism and the Cold War: The Case of Edward Lamb of Toledo, Ohio, 1901-1987." Ph.D. diss., Bowling Green State University, 2004.
- WTVN-TV History Page at the Early Television Foundation
- Edward Lamb Papers, Center for Archival Collections, Jerome Library, Bowling Green State University
- Full text of Anderson v. Mt. Clemens Pottery Co. courtesy of Findlaw.com
- Fund for the Republic archives, Princeton University
- "Program 75: No Lamb for Slaughter," Audio Archive, Center for the Study of Democratic Institutions, Davidson Library, University of California-Santa Barbara, September 26, 1963 (Interview with Edward Lamb)
