= Wiigwaasi-makak =

Box made from birch bark

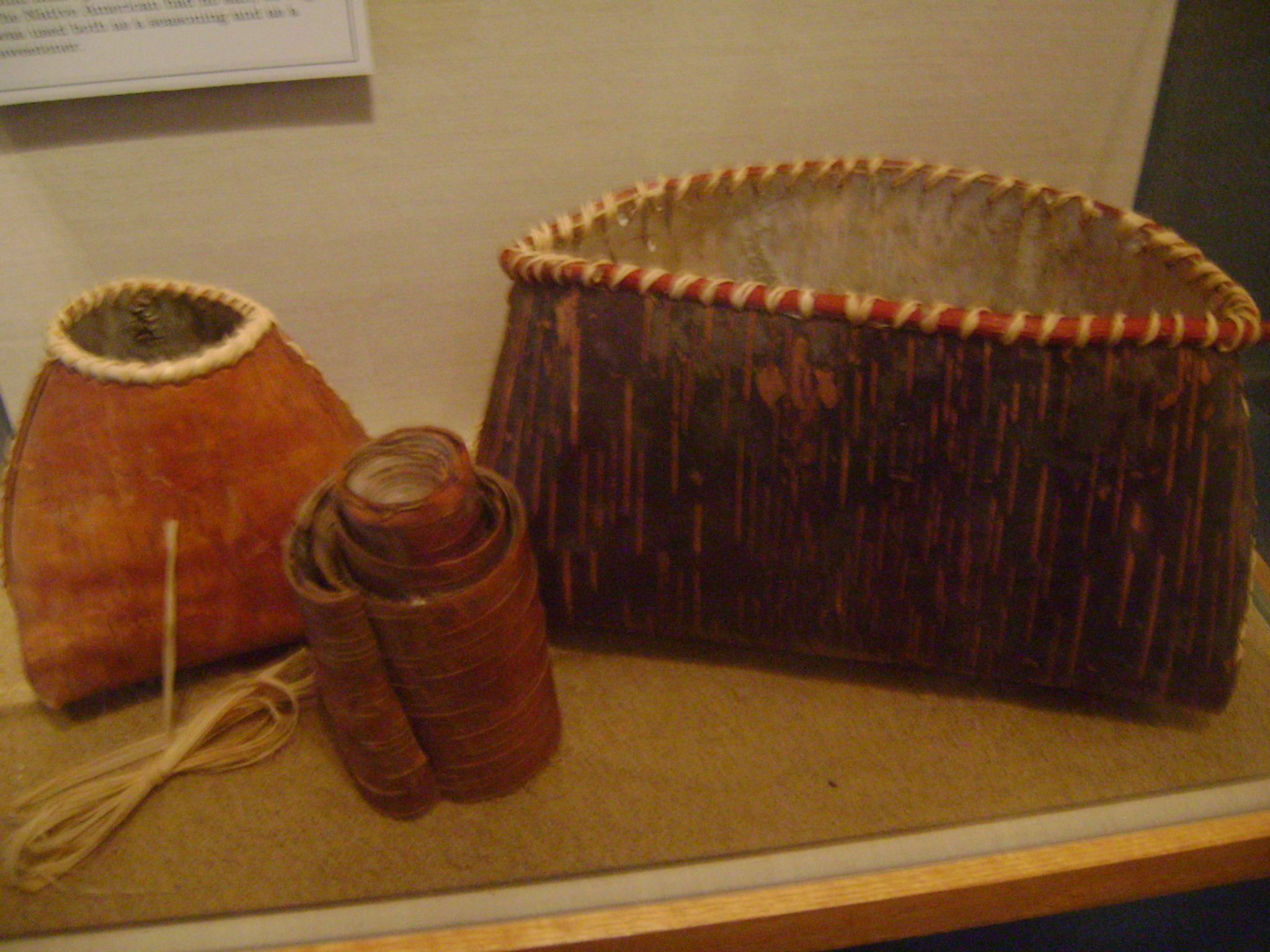
Makak birch-bark containers

A wiigwaasi-makak (plural: wiigwaasi-makakoon), meaning "birch-bark box" in the Anishinaabe language, is a box made of panels of birchbark sewn together with watap. The construction of makakoon from birchbark was an essential element in the culture of the Anishinaabe people and other members of the Native Americans and First Nations of the Upper Great Lakes, particularly in the regions surrounding Lake Superior. Birchbark makakoon continue to be crafted to this day as heritage heirlooms and for the tourist trade.

Lake Superior-area geology is short in supplies of clay, making pottery scarce for the people who lived there. However, the paper birch grows in profusion in this area, and sheets and panels of its strong, papery bark can be cut and carved from a tree for use. Birchbark boxes played a key role in creating durable packages and utensils for storage and everyday use. Skilled harvesting of the bark, done at the proper season of the year, does not fatally injure the tree.

Well-made makakoon were close to waterproof, and could be used to store soluble goods such as maple sugar. This sugar was used not only for a sweetener but as a seasoning, since the North American natives of the time had no salt. Important documents written on birchbark (wiigwaasabak) were placed in makakoon for safekeeping. Anishinaabe initiates of the Midewiwin would often secure their numinous items in a wiigwaasi-makak.

Exceptionally well-made makakoon could be used as cooking utensils, although this use declined after the arrival of Euro-American traders in the 1600s with metal pots and saucepans for sale. The makak would be filled with water and the foodstuff to be cooked, and then carefully hung over a campfire in such a way as to heat the water to the boiling point while falling short of combustion.

== Today ==
Anishinaabe craftspeople sometimes decorate their wiigwaasi-makakoon with dyed and undyed quills from the porcupine. The sharp quills are sewn into the surface of the box so as to create an abstract design or illustration.

== See also ==
- Medicine bag

== Bibliography ==
- Densmore, Frances (1928). Strength of the Earth: The Classic Guide to Ojibwe Uses of Native Plants. Minnesota Historical Society. ISBN 978-0-87351-562-7.
