= Carcieri v. Salazar =

- Supreme Court of the United States

Argued November 3, 2008 Decided February 24, 2009
- Full case name: Donald L. Carcieri, Governor of Rhode Island v. Ken L. Salazar, Secretary of the Interior, et al.
- Docket no.: 07-526
- Citations: 555 U.S. 379 (more) 129 S. Ct. 1058; 172 L. Ed. 2d 791

Case history
- Prior: Carcieri v. Norton, 290 F. Supp. 2d 167 (D.R.I. 2003); Carcieri v. Norton, 423 F.3d 45 (1st Cir. 2005); Carcieri v. Kempthorne, 497 F.3d 15 (1st Cir. 2007)

Holding
- The term "now under Federal jurisdiction" referred only to tribes that were federally recognized when the Indian Reorganization Act became law and the federal government could not take land into trust from tribes that were recognized after 1934.

Court membership
- Chief Justice John Roberts Associate Justices John P. Stevens · Antonin Scalia; Anthony Kennedy · David Souter; Clarence Thomas · Ruth Bader Ginsburg; Stephen Breyer · Samuel Alito

Case opinions
- Majority: Thomas, joined by Roberts, Scalia, Kennedy, Breyer, Alito
- Concurrence: Breyer
- Concur/dissent: Souter, joined by Ginsburg
- Dissent: Stevens

Laws applied
- 25 U.S.C. §§ 465, 479

Carcieri v. Salazar, 555 U.S. 379 (2009), was a case in which the Supreme Court of the United States held that the federal government could not take land into trust that was acquired by the Narragansett Tribe in the late 20th century, as it was not federally recognized until 1983. While well documented in historic records and surviving as a community, the tribe was largely dispossessed of its lands while under guardianship by the state of Rhode Island before suing in the 20th century.

The Court ruled that the phrase of tribes "now under Federal jurisdiction" in the Indian Reorganization Act of 1934 referred only to those tribes that were federally recognized when the act was enacted. It ruled that the federal government could not take land into trust for the Narragansett or other tribes that were federally recognized and acquired land after 1934 without an act of Congress.

== Background ==
=== Historical tribal relationship ===
The Narragansett tribe was recorded as having first contact with Europeans in 1524 at Narragansett Bay, Rhode Island. Following King Philip's War, an armed conflict between several Native American tribes and New England colonists, the Narragansett absorbed several smaller tribes, such as the Niantic. In 1709 it came under the guardianship of the colony of Rhode Island. From 1880 to 1884, Rhode Island attempted to dissolve the tribe, selling off all but 2 acres (8,100 m^{2}) of tribal communal land.

The tribe resisted, requesting repeatedly to be dealt with as a tribe. It filed suit against the state in January 1975, accusing the state of mismanagement of its lands.

In the resulting settlement, Rhode Island placed 1,800 acres (7.3 km^{2}) of land into trust for the tribe, with the condition that, with the exception of hunting and fishing regulations, state law would apply on the land.

Following this, the tribe applied for federal recognition in 1979, which was granted in 1983. At that time, its land was taken into trust by the federal government on the tribe's behalf. The tribe and the state have disagreed on a number of issues, including the collection of taxes on cigarettes sold at a reservation smoke shop and the proposed building of a gaming casino on reservation land. In 1991, the tribe purchased 31 acres (130,000 m^{2}) to be used for housing for elderly tribal members, and petitioned the Secretary of the Interior to take the land into trust as provided for under the Indian Reorganization Act, thus removing it from state jurisdiction.

=== Action by the Department of the Interior and U.S. District Court ===
In March 1998, the Bureau of Indian Affairs (BIA) notified Rhode Island of its intent to take the 31-acre (130,000 m^{2}) parcel into Federal Trust status. The state appealed this decision to the Interior Board of Indian Appeals, which ruled in favor of the tribe and the BIA.

The state filed suit in U.S. District Court, with the governor of the state, Donald Carcieri, named as plaintiff, and the Secretary of the Interior, Ken Salazar, named as defendant. The District Court ruled in favor of the BIA and the tribe.

=== U.S. Circuit Court of Appeals ===
Rhode Island appealed the District Court decision to the United States Court of Appeals for the First Circuit. A three-judge panel heard the appeal and affirmed the summary judgment of the District Court. The state requested a rehearing en banc by the full court, which was granted. On rehearing, the full court affirmed the decision of the District Court. The state appealed to the Supreme Court.

== Opinion of the US Supreme Court ==
Justice Clarence Thomas delivered the opinion of the court, reversing the judgment of the First Circuit.

Thomas determined that the authority of the BIA to take Indian land into a trust status hinged on the phrase "now under Federal jurisdiction" in 25 U.S.C. § 479. Using rules of statutory construction, he determined that this phrase limited the BIA to take Indian Land into trust only if the tribe was federally recognized in 1934 at the time of the law's enactment. This holding excluded the Narrangansett tribe from transferring land to the BIA as trust lands, since the tribe was not federally recognized until 1983.

=== Concurrence ===
Justice Stephen Breyer issued a concurring opinion, joined by Justice David Souter. He argued that the majority opinion was correct, but due to the legislative history of the bill, not based on statutory construction. Breyer allowed that even if a tribe was not formally recognized in 1934, they could still be under federal jurisdiction due to an earlier treaty or agreement.

=== Concurrence in part and dissenting in part ===
Justice Souter issued an opinion that concurred in part and dissented in part, joined by Justice Ruth Bader Ginsburg. Souter argued that the notion of under federal jurisdiction and being federally recognized were not one and the same, even if that is how the BIA and the tribe both understood it. He would have remanded for a determination of the jurisdictional issue.

=== Dissent ===
Justice John P. Stevens dissented, arguing that "now" meant "at the time the land was turned over to the BIA," and would have affirmed the lower court's decision.

== Subsequent developments ==
The decision caused an immediate reaction in both the Native American and the legal communities. The American Bar Association newsletter quickly pointed out possible adverse consequences for Indian gaming and tribal sovereignty. Many tribes have achieved federal recognition since 1934, particularly since the late 20th century, as a result of renewed activism and assertion of their cultures. Activists worked to "fix" the decision by Congressional legislative action in order to allow the BIA to continue to take Indian lands into trust. United States Senate bill S.676 was scheduled to be taken up before the end of the 112th Congress to amend language in the Indian Reorganization Act. If enacted into law, the changes would allow the BIA to take lands into trust on behalf of tribes recognized after 1934.

Elected officials in states with existing Indian gaming operations and tribes recognized prior to 1934 oppose such legislation, as they believe it will lead to more gaming activity on newly acquired land by more recently recognized tribes. Additionally, in 2009 17 state attorneys general wrote a legal opinion opposing such legislation.

On June 19, 2014, the United States Senate voted to the pass the Gun Lake Trust Land Reaffirmation Act (S. 1603; 113th Congress), a bill that would reaffirm the status of lands taken into trust by the Department of the Interior (DOI) for the benefit of the Match-E-Be-Nash-She-Wish Band. The bill explicitly provided that the Match-E-Be-Nash-She-Wish Band's land trust could not be challenged in court under this Supreme Court decision.

In 2015, the BIA approved the taking of 321 acres of land in Taunton, Massachusetts, into federal trust for the Mashpee Wampanoag tribe. The tribe announced plans to build a gaming casino on that property.

A group of Taunton property owners filed a federal lawsuit in February 2016, contending that the BIA was wrong to designate the casino site as a Native American reservation, because the tribe did not gain federal recognition until 2007. Both sides have said that they will appeal an adverse ruling to the U.S. First Circuit Court of Appeals, and if necessary to the U.S. Supreme Court.

== See also ==
- Match-E-Be-Nash-She-Wish Band of Pottawatomi Indians v. Patchak (2012)
