= Angelique Merasty =

Canadian First Nations birchbark biting artist

Angelique Merasty (1924–17 January 1996) was a Canadian First Nations birchbark biting artist of the Woodland Cree First Nation.

== Background ==
Merasty was born in Amisk Lake, Saskatchewan, where she spent most of her life practicing and selling her artwork.

Merasty was best known for her birchbark bitings, the Indigenous art practice of dentally perforating designs into folded sheets of thin bark. Birchbark biting is one of the oldest Indigenous art forms, historically practiced by women of the Subarctic and Northeastern Woodlands of Canada and the United States. While most birchbark biters created designs with lines, Merasty used a pointillist approach and created complex symmetrical images of flowers, insects, animals, and landscape sceneries. She died at the age of 66, and was one of the last recorded artists to maintain the Indigenous, traditional art of birchbark biting. Merasty's work was showcased in several Canadian museums including the Museum of Man and Nature and the Thunder Bay Art Gallery.

== Personal life ==
Merasty grew up on an island in Amisk Lake in northern Saskatchewan, where she lived with her mother, Susan Ballantyne. She married Bill Merasty in 1947, who also assisted Angelique Merasty with her artistic practices. Together, they had one son named Joseph Merasty, who died six months after his birth due to an illness. By the time Angelique turned 50, her birchbark biting practice caused many of her teeth to fall out. She was however, able to get false teeth funded by the government, including two sharpened upper canines that were specifically designed to help Merasty continue her art. On 7 January 1996, Merasty died of a heart attack in Saskatoon.

== Artistic career ==
=== Methods and style ===
Merasty is best known for her birchbark bitings. Birchbark biting was historically a social past time, but in the 1950s, Merasty and her mother, Susan Ballantyne, began to sell their work at a summer resort near their home for 10 or 15 cents each. Merasty collected bark with the assistance of her husband, Bill Merasty. Together, they would travel by boat up to 15 miles away to find the best trees, which were white, smooth, clean, and at least 10 layers thick. The best season for harvesting bark was during the spring when trees were thawing. Immediately after a harvest was the ideal time to birchbark bite.

Merasty’s process for creating each biting remained consistent. For each work, she folded a fresh layer of birch bark two or more times depending on the size and complexity of the work. Merasty would then rotate the folded shape by using her hands and tongue, while biting marks along its folds. Her designs usually began at the centre fold, and moved toward the outer edges. The pressure of her bites varied, resulting in a range of shades and surface textures. Her method of creating produced intricate and symmetrical compositions. The sizes of her works were anywhere from seven-and-a-half centimetres to around twenty-five centimetres.

In Merasty’s early artistic practices, her designs were mostly geometric, but she later emerged with a unique style. She departed from established practices, by utilizing a pointillist approach for her bitings, rather than linear incisions. Merasty achieved complex, curvilinear designs, with a preference for flower and animal imagery. Later in her career, she was able to complete works from beginning to end without looking at her progress.

=== Exhibitions ===
Merasty’s art was showcased in many Canadian museums, including the Museum of Man and Nature (1980) and the Thunder Bay Art Gallery (1983). Her work was also selected to be offered as a first prize for notable local and provincial cross country skiing competitions. Permanent displays of her work are on show at the Flin Flon Library as well as the Smithsonian Institution in Washington. Today, collectors pay thousands of dollars for her work.

== Legacy ==
Angelique Merasty was one of the last practicing birch-biters recorded in North America during her time. She passed her teachings on to a woman named Angelique Merasty Levac, who lives in Prince George, BC. She is known for reviving the art or birch-bark biting, and there is now an estimate of 12 known people who continue this tradition in North America.
