= Portal to Portal Act of 1947 =

United States labor law

The Portal to Portal Act of 1947 (29 USC §§251–262) was an Act of Congress on United States labor law, passed to limit the remedies available in the Fair Labor Standards Act of 1938 (FLSA). Along with the Taft-Hartley Act of 1947, which decreased the rights of employees and labor unions in the National Labor Relations Act of 1935, the Portal to Portal Act of 1947 was passed by a Republican Congress to limit rights in enforcing the minimum wage in the United States.

== Contents ==
- §251(a) as a preamble statement of policy, reads that the FLSA has been "interpreted judicially in disregard of long-established customs, practices, and contracts between employers and employees, thereby creating wholly unexpected liabilities"
- §252(c) working time is defined to be time that is compensable under (a) contract, collective agreement or custom or (b) when it was compensable.
- §254, limits employer liability for time spent in "preliminary and postliminary" activity.

It places a two-year limitations on claims to enforce the FLSA, Walsh-Healey or Davis-Bacon Act, but allows three years for wilful violations (this was introduced in 1966).

- §259, creates a defense if the employer underpaid workers "in good faith in conformity and in reliance on any written administrative regulation, order, ruling, approval or interpretation" of the Secretary of Labor.
- §260, the defense operates against a liquidated damages claim, rather than unpaid wages claim if the employer proves "he had reasonable grounds for believing that his act or omission was not a violation."

== See also ==
- US labor law
