= Match-e-be-nash-she-wish Band of Pottawatomi =

Federally recognized tribe in Michigan, United States

Mjébnéshiniyek

Regions with significant populations
- United States ( Michigan)

Languages
- English, Potawatomi

Religion
- traditional tribal religion, Christianity

Related ethnic groups
- Council of Three Fires (Odawa, Ojibwe, and other Potawatomi tribes)

The Match-e-be-nash-she-wish Band of Pottawatomi (Potawatomi: Mjébnéshiniyek) is a federally recognized tribe of Potawatomi people in Michigan named for a 19th-century Ojibwe chief. They are headquartered in Bradley, Michigan.

== Names ==
The tribe was previously known as the Match-e-be-nash-she-wish Band of Pottawatomi Indians of Michigan, the Gun Lake Band of Grand River Ottawa Indians, the United Nation of Chippewa, Ottawa and Pottawatomi Indians of Michigan, Inc., and the Gun Lake Tribe or Gun Lake Band.

== History ==
Ancestors of this mixed band belonged to the Ojibwe (Chippewa), Ottawa, and Pottawatomi peoples, who lived around the Great Lakes in what became Canada and the United States. The tribes tended to be highly decentralized, with most people living in bands. Under pressure and encroachment by Europeans, there were substantial population losses among the tribes, and some of their people moved west into Minnesota. Others remained in rural areas of Michigan and Wisconsin.

They all spoke Algonquian languages, part of a large language family extending from the Atlantic Coast and around the Great Lakes, and had some cultural similarities. Original members of the Gun Lake Band were survivors of these three tribes who gathered together in community near Gun Lake, Michigan.

== Government ==
The Match-e-be-nash-she-wish Band of Pottawatomi Indians were recognized as a sovereign nation by the United States' federal government in 1988. It has a written constitution and elected democratic government, consisting of several tribal council members.

The current (October 16, 2026) Tribal Council is as follows:

- Jodie Palmer, Tribal Chairwoman (At-Large District)
- Eric Sprague, Vice Chairman (Bradley District)
- Ben Brenner, Secretary (Salem District)
- Ed Pigeon, Treasurer (Salem District)
- Brian Trevan, Councilor (At-Large District)
- Amy Austin, Councilor (Bradley District)
- Hunter Levandoski, Councilor (Bradley District)

== Membership ==
The tribal council voted on rules for enrollment or membership in the tribe. As of 2009, the tribe's enrollment is open only to babies born to current tribal members.

The tribe says they are "a body of mixed-blood Chippewa, Ottawa, and Pottawatomi" who trace their descent from the principal chief Match-e-be-nash-she-wish. Under the Treaty of Chicago in 1821, the US government provided him and his followers with a reserve near Kalamazoo, Michigan.

== Reservation ==
Location of the Match-e-be-nash-she-wish Reservation

The Match-e-be-nash-she-wish Reservation (42°38′03″N 85°39′26″W) is located in Wayland Township, south of the city of Wayland, Michigan. Since being recognized, the tribe was assigned land in trust by the federal government in 2005.

In 2009 under Carcieri v. Salazar, the US Supreme Court ruled that the government could not take land into trust for tribes that were recognized after the passage of the Indian Reorganization Act of 1934.

Congress in 2014 passed Public Law No: 113-179 (September 26, 2014), a law to clarify that the Match-e-be-nash-she-wish Band's land trust assigned to them in 2005 could not be challenged in court under the United States Supreme Court decision of Carcieri v. Salazar.

== Tribal enterprises ==
The primary tribal enterprise is the Gun Lake Casino. The first phase was built in 2009 on part of the 147 acres in Allegan County, Michigan that the tribe was given in January 2009 as a land base by the federal government. It generated 750 jobs during construction. The tribe estimated that it would attract 60,000 guests annually to area hotels. The casino itself is currently a building site for a hotel as well. Further, they estimated the enterprise would bring 600 casino jobs.

The tribe publishes a newspaper, called The Tribal Tribune. They provide cultural workshops on traditional practices, such as cradle fire from flint, tapping and processing maple sugar, creating basswood and hemp dogbane cordage, snowsnakes or zhoshke'nayabo, and black ash basketry, a traditional art form among Michigan tribes.

== Education ==
The reservation is served by Wayland Union Schools.

== Notable members ==
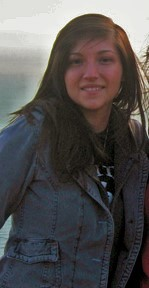
Cherish Parrish, sixth-generation black ash basket weaver and enrolled tribal member

- Kelly Church, basket maker, birchbark bite, and Woodlands school painter
- Match-E-Be-Nash-She-Wish, 18th- and 19th-century Potawatomi chief
- Aaliyah Nye, professional basketball player for the Atlanta Dream of the WNBA
- Cherish Parrish, basket maker, birchbark biter
