= Rainy River District School Board =

School board in Ontario, Canada

Location
- 522 Second St E, Fort Frances, Ontario, Canada P9A 1N4 Fort Frances; Atikokan; Rainy River; Bergland; Stratton; Barwick; Emo; Devlin Canada
- Coordinates: 48.61227°N 93.38847°W

District information
- Chair of the board: Kathryn Pierroz
- Director of education: Heather Campbell
- Schools: 15 Total (3 Secondary, 12 Elementary)
- Budget: CA$58 million
- District ID: B28053

Students and staff
- Students: 2,557

Other information
- Elected trustees: Kathryn Pierroz; Sarah Creed; John Fuhrer; Jeff Lehman; Tammy Ryll; Mike Walchuk
- Website: www.rrdsb.com

The Rainy River District School Board (RRDSB), previously known as English-language Public District School Board No. 5B until 1999, is a school board in the province of Ontario, Canada. Serving as the primary school district administrator for English language public schools in the Rainy River District, Ontario, the board caters to approximately 2,557 students as of 2022. Its operational jurisdiction span across an administrative region covering 10,552 square kilometers.

== High schools ==
=== Fort Frances High School ===
Located in Fort Frances, Ontario, Fort Frances High School offers grades 7 through 12. It is the only high school in Fort Frances.

Fort Frances High School began offering grades 7 and 8 starting in the 2016–17 school year. Grade 7/8 students from the neighboring J.W. Walker Elementary will be transferred to Fort Frances High School and that school will only offer up to grade 6.

School Information:

- Team Name: Fort Frances Muskies
- School Colours:
- Motto: Learning for All
- Address: 440 McIrvine Rd, Fort Frances, Ontario, Canada P9A 3T8
- Website:

2016-2017 Administration:

- Principal: Jenn Leishman

=== Atikokan High School ===
Atikokan High School is located in the small town of Atikokan, Ontario. It offers grade 7 through 12 and is the only high school in Atikokan.

School Information:

- Team Name: Atikokan Voyageurs
- School Colours:
- Motto: Excellence through the Courage to Care
- Address: 324 Mercury Ave, Atikokan, Ontario, Canada P0T 1C0
- Website:

2014-2015 Administration:

- Principal: Beth Fairfield

=== Rainy River High School ===
Rainy River High School is the only high school in the town of Rainy River, Ontario and offers grade 9 through 12.

School Information:

- Team Name: Rainy River Owls
- School Colours:
- Motto: Together, we empower all students to believe in themselves, to achieve, and to dream (School board mission statement)
- Address: 1 Mill Ave, Rainy River, Ontario, Canada P0W 1L0
- Website:

2014-2015 Administration:

- Principal: Kelly Agar

== Elementary schools ==
=== Robert Moore Public School ===
Robert Moore Public School is located in Fort Frances, Ontario. It offers grades JK through 8.

School Information:

- Team Name: Robert Moore Mustangs
- School Colours:
- Motto: Stampeding to Success
- Address: 528 Second St E, Fort Frances, Ontario, Canada P9A 1N4
- Website:

2022-2023 Administration:

- Principals: Charlayne Bliss & Kerri Tolen

=== J.W. Walker Public School ===
J.W. Walker Public School is located in the Fort Frances, Ontario. It offers grades JK through 6.

Starting in the 2016–2017 school year, JW Walker School stopped offering grades 7 and 8. Grade 7/8 students from J.W. Walker will be transferred to the neighbouring Fort Frances High School.

School Information:

- Team Name: Walker Wildcats
- School Colours:
- Motto: Making a Difference Together
- Address: 475 Keating Ave, Fort Frances, Ontario, Canada P9A 3K8
- Website:

2022-2023 Administration:

- Principal: Sonja Bodnarchuk
- Vice Principal: Lynne Avis

=== North Star Community School ===
North Star Community School is located in Atikokan, Ontario, approximately 140 km east of Fort Frances. It serves the Eastern part of the Rainy River District and offers grades JK through 6.

School Information:

- School Colours:
- Motto: We Shine Bright!
- Address: 209 Hawthorne Road, Atikokan, Ontario, Canada P0T 1C0
- Website:

2022-2023 Administration:

- Principal: Carly Skrenski

=== Crossroads Elementary School ===
Crossroads Elementary School is located in Devlin, Ontario, approximately 20 km west of Fort Frances. It offers grades JK through 8.

School Information:

- Team Name: Crossroad Tornadoes
- School Colours:
- Motto: Make today awesome!
- Address: RR#1 Highway 613 North, Devlin, Ontario, Canada P0W 1C0
- Website:

2022-2023 Administration:

- Principal: Sharla MacKinnon

=== Donald Young School ===
Donald Young School is located in Emo, Ontario, approximately 30 km west of Fort Frances. It offers grades JK through 8.

School Information:

- Team Name: Donald Young All Stars
- School Colours:
- Motto: Home of the All Stars!
- Address: 9024 ON-602, Emo, ON P0W 1E0, Canada
- Website:

2022-2023 Administration:

- Principal: Shane Beckett
- Vice Principal: Serena Maharaj

=== Nestor Falls Elementary School ===
Nestor Falls Elementary School is located in Nestor Falls, Ontario, approximately 110 km northwest of Fort Frances on Highway 71. It offers grades JK through 8.

School Information:

- Team Name: Nestor Falls Lakers
- School Colours:
- Motto: Home of the Lakers!
- Address: PO Box 219, Nestor Falls, Ontario, Canada P0X 1K0
- Website:

2022-2023 Administration:

- Principal: Donna Kowalski

=== Sturgeon Creek Elementary School ===
Sturgeon Creek Elementary School is located just north of Barwick, Ontario, approximately 40 km west of Fort Frances. It offers grades JK through 8.

School Information:

- Team Name: Sturgeon Creek Sturgeons
- School Colours:
- Motto: Hooked on learning!
- Address: Box 357, Emo, Ontario, Canada P0W 1E0

2022-2023 Administration:

- Principal: Donna Kowalski

=== Sturgeon Creek Alt. Program ===
Sturgeon Creek Alternative Program is no longer associated with the Rainy River District School Board.

Press Release: Rainy River District School Board Minutes:

=== McCrosson-Tovell Elementary School ===
McCrosson-Tovell Elementary School is located in Bergland, Ontario, approximately 150 km west and North of Fort Frances, on Highway 621 towards Morson, Ontario. It offers grades JK through 8.

School Information:

- Team Name: McCrosson Timberwolves
- School Colours:
- Motto: Home of the Timberwolves!
- Address: Site 2, Box 1, Sleeman, Ontario, Canada P0W 1M0

2014-2015 Administration:

- Principal: Kari-Lynn Beckett

=== Riverview Elementary School ===
Located in the community of Rainy River, Ontario, approximately 90 km west of Fort Frances on the border of Baudette, Minnesota. It offers grades JK through 8.

School Information:

- Team Name: Riverview Royals
- School Colours:
- Motto: Home of the Royals!
- Address: 11 Mill Ave, Rainy River, Ontario, Canada P0W 1L0

2022-2023 Administration:

- Principal: Kari-Lynn Beckett
- Vice Principal: Donna Osadchuk

== Former Elementary Schools ==
- Alberton School
- Sixth Street School
- F.H. Huffman School
- Alexander Mackenzie School

== Partnerships ==
As of 2013, the Rainy River District School Board has partnered with the Seven Generations Education Institute, the Ministry of Education, and local First Nations’ communities in development of new technologies and programs for revitalization of the Ojibwe language.

== See also ==
- The Northwest Catholic District School Board
- List of school districts in Ontario
- List of high schools in Ontario
