= Emo Speedway Championships =

Emo Speedway: Racing History, 2009, Canada

Coordinates: 48.634447°N 93.8355°W

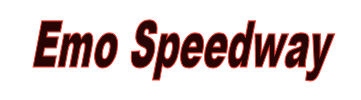
- Category: Stock car racing, Dirt track racing
- Country: Emo, Ontario (Canada)
- Inaugural season: 1954
- Engine suppliers: Chevrolet; Dodge; Ford; Chrysler
- Drivers' champion: Brody Strachan (WISSOTA Modifieds), Patrick Davis (WISSOTA Midwest Modifieds), A.J. Kellar (Street Stocks,
- Official website: Borderland Racing Association

The Emo Speedway is a racing facility, located in Emo, Ontario. It is operated by the Borderland Racing Association. It is one of three tracks under WISSOTA sanction in Ontario.

In 2024, the Track celebrated its 70th anniversary.

The Borderland Racing Association currently hosts three different classes and range from Street Stocks (Entry level), the WISSOTA Midwest Modifieds (Moderate Level), to WISSOTA Modifieds (Advanced Level). 4-Cylinders/Hornets race during special events.

Street Stocks are "Stock Cars" as they have a full body and frame from passenger type automobiles seen on the street (Such as a 1974 Monte Carlo). They are required to have a minimum weight of 3200 lbs (1,451 kg), a stock maximum 355c.i.d. (360 for Chryslers), as well as OEM parts.

WISSOTA Midwest Modifieds are similar to Street Stocks in that their engine is a maximum 355c.i.d., however, they are open wheeled (No fenders) and have a minimum weight of 2600 lbs (1,179 kg). As well, suspension and rear-end are more adjustable.

The highest class at the Emo Speedway is the WISSOTA Modifieds. This class is similar in appearance as a WISSOTA Midwest Modified with the exception of some cosmetic differences. However, the WISSOTA Modified class has a minimum weight of 2450 lbs (1,111 kg) and can run a Manual Transmission, a Spec Engine (Turning out up to 600-650 hp), and an alcohol fuel option.

The season consists of 16-18 race nights (Heat races and one feature per night, per class and consolations if necessary), although due to rainouts during the season, an average of 12-14 races are run for the championship.

Each class runs their own season points. Points are tallied every weekend based on the point system by the Sanctioning body of WISSOTA. Points go to the driver in the WISSOTA classes and to the car number in the Street Stocks.

== History ==
=== One Class of Cars (1950s and 1960s) ===
The first racing season started on July 30, 1954 and only one class competed. Cars with all types of engines raced including Mathieu's V12 Rocket. The season started out with thirteen competitors and the number fluctuated very little until the end of the season in September. According to the Daily Journal in International Falls, #411 "King Al" Gerald of International Falls, MN won the first "championship" called the "Cup". Races were also held whenever possible, but was usually on a Friday, and they occurred as many times as three a week.

In 1955, #37 Raoul "The Flying Frenchman" Cayer of Nestor Falls, Ontario won his first championship at the Emo Speedway and also took honours as the time trial champion in that year. Al McDowell took the championship in 1956. Currently, it is unknown who won the championships in 1957 to 1959. The track was closed at the end of the 1959 season.

The track reopened in 1965, but it is uncertain whether a points season was tallied. Currently, there is no information of champions from 1965 and 1966. In 1967, #54 Larry Kennedy took the championship, his only title in his years of racing at the speedway. In 1968, the underdog of the Emo Speedway, #33 George Oltsher would be triumphant in beating the much bigger competition to win his first championship of three he would earn.

1969 saw owner Ed Rea with his driver #38 Mike Andrusco win the championship in the last season of the 1960s.

=== The Introduction of a Second Class (1970s) ===
1970 saw #33 George Oltsher return to the champions circle at the end of the season, the last year in which there was only one class of cars. 1971 saw the introduction of Hobby Stocks. Although the rules are currently not known to the full extent, Hobby Stocks provided a different and specific set of rules and guidelines that would make cars more even on the track.

The first Hobby Stock Champion was #1 Borden Beeler in 1971, while #36 Larry Long of International Falls, MN would win the top class. Both classes would run championship point seasons until 1973. There were no points in 1974 due to a shortened season and 1975 had only a few events. The Emo Speedway would shut down until its second revival in 1983.

=== The Return of Season Championships (1980s) ===
After three years of exhibition racing, the Borderland Racing Association became the operating body of the Emo Speedway. The first full season started in 1986. Two classes were run (Modifieds, Street Stocks) and they had locally created rules. A son of Ed Rea, #38 Dan Rea would win the Modified championship, while #35 Harold "Beaker" Duivenvoorden would take the Street Stock championship.

In 1989, The Modifieds became sanctioned with WISSOTA, (A Promoters Association with a common set of rules and regulations), allowing the class to have to ability to travel to other "WISSOTA" tracks and also compete for a National Championship.

=== The Addition of a Third Class (1990s) ===
In 1992, with the concentrated effort of a group of volunteers, the Thunder Class was created. The "Thunders" ran a smaller engine than the Street Stocks with an engine no bigger than 305c.i.d. and an unlocked rear-end differential. The cars were slower but became an affordable entry level class for teenagers and young adults to get into racing. It was hard to distinguish them in appearance as the main differences were under the hood. Driving partners #7 Scott Gobeil and Donnie May would become the season champions of the new class at the Emo Speedway. However the class would be removed in 1995 due to low numbers.

In 1994, the Mini-Sprint class started full seasons at the Emo Speedway. The class was very different from what had been seen at the Speedway before. The appearance of the car had a short wheelbase, two wings (on top and in the front) and ran a snowmobile engine that turned out a maximum 600cc. In that year, the Borderland Racing Association ran four classes of cars. Currently, the season champion of the Mini-Sprints during their inaugural season is unknown.

=== End of Mini-Sprints and addition of WISSOTA Midwest Modifieds (2000s) ===
The WISSOTA Midwest Modified class was new to the Emo Speedway in 2004. At the end of 2004, after eleven seasons of Mini-Sprints, the class was canceled due to a severe shortage of cars. During the Annual Rea Memorial weekend (The biggest weekend of the year), only three Mini-Sprints entered which was the complete opposite usually experienced on the two-day weekend event. Mini-Sprint driver #2X4 Ken Perry would win the last championship for the Mini-Sprints, while #11 Anthony Visser, (Former Street Stock and Thunder Stock racer) won the inaugural WISSOTA Midwest Modified Championship. The WISSOTA Midwest Modifieds peaked its average of nineteen cars a week in 2009, with a decline to fourteen cars on average in 2010.

== Championship Records ==
14C Cody Ossachuk (2015-2019) has won five championships in a row.

17 Christopher Leek (2011-2014) and #99 Brody Strachan (2016-2019) have both won four championships in row.

2R Ricky Roche (1996–1998), #33 Kendal Gamsby (2006–2008), and #16 Gavin Paull (2011-2013) and #2X4 Ken Perry (1998-2000) have three championships in a row.

There are several drivers that have won a championship two years in a row. These include #91X Rudy Anderson in the Street Stocks (1989–1990), #23 Chuck Arpin in the WISSOTA Modifieds (1990–1991), #19 John Hettinga (1991–1992) in Street Stocks, #35 Colin Johnson (1993–1994) in Street Stocks, #15 Ron Westover (2002–2003) in the Street Stocks, #91 Victor Larson (2003–2004) in the WISSOTA Modifieds, #14F Greg Ferris in the WISSOTA Modifieds (2008–2009), and #85 Jeff Davis (2021-2022) in the WISSOTA Modifieds.

15 Ron Westover has the most total championships at the Emo Speedway with seven (7), (1995, 1998, 2002, 2003, 2007, 2010, 2013). One championship, (1995) was in the Thunder Stocks while the others are in the Street Stocks. #14C Cody Ossachuk, #99 Brody Strachan, #16 Gavin Paull and #2X4 Ken Perry have the next number of championships at five, #17 Christopher Leek, #19 John Hettinga and #33 Kendal Gamsby with four. Three of John Hettinga's are in the Street Stocks (1991,1992, 2004) and one in the WISSOTA Midwest Modifieds (2005), all of Ken Perry's is in the Mini-Sprints, all of Gavin Paull's is in the WISSOTA Modifieds and Kendal Gamsby has three in WISSOTA Midwest Modifieds and one in Street Stocks. Christopher Leek's championships are all in the WISSOTA Midwest Modifieds as with Cody Ossachuk.

The number 33 has the most championships (9) for a car number. Three of them are by George Oltsher (1968,1970, 1972), one by Scott Gobeil (1993), four by Kendal Gamsby (2006, 2007, 2008, 2014) and one by Cole Chernosky (2020). All #15 Championships have been won by one family, with Ron Westover and his son Raice Westover.

== Champions List ==
***Note: Seasons that had Championships are the only ones included in the list of champions. There were years in which the races occurred at some point in the season but did not run a points championship. Championship records are declared based on information that has been provided so far, as more information is discovered, records may change.

WISSOTA Super Stocks were run in 1996 and 1997, #5 Steve Boyum of International Falls was the 1996 Champion. The 1997 Champion is currently unknown.

Year	WISSOTA Modifieds	WISSOTA Midwest Modifieds	Street Stocks	Mini-Sprints	Thunder Stocks	Modified/Late Model Class	Hobby Stocks
2025	(Canada) #12P Brandon Pelepetz (Emo, ON)	(Canada) #59x James Lambert (Fort Frances, ON)	(Canada) #54x AJ Kellar (Devlin, ON)				
2024	(Canada) #99 Brody Strachan (Devlin, ON)	(Canada) #10D Patrick Davis (Sioux Lookout, ON)	(Canada) #54x AJ Kellar (Devlin, ON)				
2023	(Canada) #4JR Cameron Brown (Rainy River, ON)	(Canada) #3X Jesse Thompson (Emo, ON)	(Canada) #54 Dean Kellar (Devlin, ON)				
2022	(Canada) #85 Jeff Davis (Devlin, ON)	(Canada) #Brandon Rehill (St. Andrews, MB)	(Canada) #55 Tylar Wilson (Fort Frances, ON)				
2021	(Canada) #85 Jeff Davis (Devlin, ON)	(Canada) #59x James Lambert (Fort Frances, ON)	(Canada) #15w Raice Westover (Fort Frances, ON)				
2020 (Covid-19, 5 Events)	(Canada) #48 Jerome Guyot (Fannystalle, MB)	(Canada) #33c Cole Chernosky (Thunder Bay, ON)	(Canada) #96w Darren Wolframe (Thunder Bay, ON)				
2019	(Canada) #99 Brody Strachan (Emo, ON)	(Canada) #14C Cody Ossachuk (Pinewood, ON)	(Canada) #15R Raice Westover (Fort Frances, ON)				
2018	(Canada) #99 Brody Strachan (Emo, ON)	(Canada) #14C Cody Ossachuk (Pinewood, ON)	(Canada) #55 Tylar Wilson (Fort Frances, ON)				
2017	(Canada) #99 Brody Strachan (Emo, ON)	(Canada) #14C Cody Ossachuk (Pinewood, ON)	(Canada) #86 Kevin Desserre (Dryden, ON)				
2016	(Canada) #99 Brody Strachan (Emo, ON)	(Canada) #14C Cody Ossachuk (Pinewood, ON)	(Canada) #54X A.J. Kellar (Fort Frances, ON)				
2015	(Canada) #85D Jeff Davis (Devlin, ON)	(Canada) #14C Cody Ossachuk (Pinewood, ON)	(Canada) #55 Tylar Wilson (Fort Frances, ON)				
2014	(Canada) #4 Steve Nordin (Stratton, ON)	(Canada) #17 Christopher Leek (Emo, ON)	(Canada) #33 Kendal Gamsby (Stratton, ON)				
2013	(Canada) #16 Gavin Paull (Fort Frances, ON)	(Canada) #17 Christopher Leek (Emo, ON)	(Canada) #15 Ron Westover (Fort Frances, ON)				
2012	(Canada) #16 Gavin Paull (Fort Frances, ON)	(Canada) #17 Christopher Leek (Emo, ON)	(Canada) #500 Libby Wilson (Fort Frances, ON)				
2011	(Canada) #16 Gavin Paull (Fort Frances, ON)	(Canada) #17 Christopher Leek (Emo, ON)	(United States) #38 Don Bowman (Bemidji, MN)				
2010	(Canada) #99 Glen Strachan (Emo, ON)	(Canada) #50 Brady Caul (Fort Frances, ON)	(Canada) #15 Ron Westover (Devlin, ON)				
2009	(Canada) #14 Greg Ferris (Finland, ON)	(United States) #99C Tridell Champlin (Deer River, MN)	(United States) #18M Scott Messner (Bemidji, MN)				
2008	(Canada) #14 Greg Ferris (Finland, ON)	(Canada) #33 Kendal Gamsby (Atikokan, ON)	(Canada) #500 Tylar Wilson (Fort Frances, ON)				
2007	(Canada) #16 Gavin Paull (Fort Frances, ON)	(Canada) #33 Kendal Gamsby (Atikokan, ON)	(Canada) #15 Ron Westover (Devlin, ON)				
2006	(Canada) #8 Curtis Kamm (Dryden, ON)	(Canada) #33 Kendal Gamsby (Atikokan, ON)	(Canada) #25 Richard Visser/Trudy Engels (Emo, ON)				
2005	(Canada) #85 Jamie Davis (Devlin, ON)	(Canada) #19 John Hettinga (Emo, ON)	(Canada) #04 Gary Grimes (Balmertown, ON)				
2004	(Canada) #91 Victor Larson (Dryden, ON)	(Canada) #11 Anthony Visser (Emo, ON)	(Canada) #19 John Hettinga (Emo, ON)	(Canada) #2X4 Ken Perry (Fort Frances, ON)			
2003	(Canada) #91 Victor Larson (Dryden, ON)		(Canada) #15 Ron Westover (Devlin, ON)	(Canada) #2X4 Ken Perry (Fort Frances, ON)			
2002	(Canada) #16 Gavin Paull (Fort Frances, ON)		(Canada) #15 Ron Westover (Devlin, ON)	(United States) #15 Kyle Ridlon (Aurora, MN)			
2001	(Canada) #00 Steve Arpin (Fort Frances, ON)		(Canada) #14 Jake Hasbargen (ON)	(Canada) #77 Ken Perry Jr. (Fort Frances, ON)			
2000	(Canada) #85 Mark Davis (Devlin, ON)		(United States) #77 Mark Kangas (Mountain Iron, MN)	(Canada) #2X4 Ken Perry (Fort Frances, ON)			
1999	(Canada) #00 Steve Arpin (Fort Frances, ON)		(United States) #71 Gary Mintinen Jr. (Bemidji, MN)	(Canada) #2X4 Ken Perry (Fort Frances, ON)			
1998	(United States) #2R Ricky Roche (International Falls, MN)		(Canada) #15 Ron Westover (Devlin, ON)	(Canada) #2X4 Ken Perry (Fort Frances, ON)			
1997	(United States) #2R Ricky Roche (International Falls, MN)		(Canada) #2 Don Wilson (Emo, ON)	Unknown			
1996	(United States) #2R Ricky Roche (International Falls, MN)		(Canada) #35 Colin Johnson (Barwick, ON)	(Canada) #14 Robin Woolsey (Barwick, ON)			
1995	(Canada) #14 Greg Ferris (Finland, ON)		(United States) #45 Wade Kennedy (International Falls, MN)	Unknown	(Canada) #15 Ron Westover (Devlin, ON)		
1994	(Canada) #39 Mark Rea (Devlin, ON)		(Canada) #35 Colin Johnson (Barwick, ON)	Unknown	(Canada) #3 Dale Faragher (Devlin, ON)		
1993	(United States) #69 Kelly Steele (International Falls, MN)		(Canada) #35 Colin Johnson (Barwick, ON)		(Canada) #33 Scott Gobeil (Fort Frances, ON)		
1992	(Canada) #39 Mark Rea (Devlin, ON)		(Canada) #19 John Hettinga (Emo, ON)		(Canada) #7 Don May/Scott Gobeil (Emo, ON)		
1991	(Canada) #23 Chuck Arpin (Fort Frances, ON)		(Canada) #19 John Hettinga (Emo, ON)				
1990	(Canada) #23 Chuck Arpin (Fort Frances, ON)		(Canada) #91X Rudy Anderson (Devlin, ON)				
1989	(Canada) #21P Dwayne Pihulak (Crozier, ON)		(Canada) #91X Rudy Anderson (Devlin, ON)				
1988	(Canada) #39 Mark Rea (Devlin, ON)(1)		(Canada) #850 Dwayne "Stubby" DeGagne (Emo, ON)				
1987	(Canada) #6 Gary Wilson (Devlin, ON)(1)		(Canada) #500 Tylar Wilson (Fort Frances, ON)				
1986	(Canada) #38 Dan Rea (Devlin, ON)(1)		(Canada) #035 Harold "Beaker" Duivenvoorden (Devlin, ON)				
1973						(United States) #13 Al Weir (International Falls, MN)	(Canada) #41 Roy Korpi (Fort Frances, ON)
1972						(Canada) #33 George Oltsher (Barwick, ON)	(United States) #10 Don Potter (International Falls, MN)
1971						(United States) #36 Larry Long (International Falls, MN)	(Canada) #1 Borden Beeler (Emo, ON)
1970						(Canada) #33 George Oltsher (Barwick, ON)	
1969						(Canada) #38 Mike Andrusco (Fort Frances, ON)	
1968						(Canada) #33 George Oltsher (Barwick, ON)	
1967						(United States) #54 Larry Kennedy (International Falls, MN)	
1956						(Canada) Al McDowell (Fort Frances, ON)	
1955						(Canada) #37 Raoul Cayer (Nestor Falls, ON)	
1954						(United States) #411 Al Gerald (International Falls, MN)	

(1) Modifieds were not sanctioned by WISSOTA in these years.
