= 2010 Missouri-Illinois Dodge Dealers 250 =

Race details
- Map of Speedway
- Date: July 17, 2010
- Official name: 2010 Missouri-Illinois Dodge Dealers 250
- Location: Gateway Motorsports Park in Madison, Illinois
- Course: Oval
- Course length: 1.250 miles (2.012 km)
- Distance: 200 laps, 250 mi (402.336 km)
- Weather: Clear
- Average speed: 101.787 mph (163.810 km/h)
- Attendance: 52,000

Pole position
| Driver | Trevor Bayne | Diamond-Waltrip Racing |
- Time: 33.691

Most laps led
| Driver | Brad Keselowski | Penske Racing |
- Laps: 136

Winner
| No. 60 | Carl Edwards | Roush Fenway Racing |

Television in the United States
- Network: ESPN2
- Announcers: Dave Burns, Ricky Craven, Rusty Wallace

The 2010 Missouri-Illinois Dodge Dealers 250 was a NASCAR Nationwide Series race held at Gateway Motorsports Park in Madison, Illinois on July 17, 2010. The race was the 14th iteration of the event and the 19th race of the 2010 NASCAR Nationwide Series. Trevor Bayne won the pole while Brad Keselowski led the most laps at 136. But it was Carl Edwards who took the win after Edwards caused a massive crash on the final lap when Edwards spun Keselowski that furthered their rivalry and also involved Brad's father.

== Background ==
World Wide Technology Raceway (formerly Gateway International Raceway and Gateway Motorsports Park) is a motorsport racing facility in Madison, Illinois, just east of St. Louis, Missouri, United States, close to the Gateway Arch. It features a 1.25-mile (2 kilometer) oval that hosts the NASCAR Cup Series, NASCAR Craftsman Truck Series, and the NTT IndyCar Series, a 1.6-mile (2.6 km) infield road course used by the SCCA, Porsche Club of America, and various car clubs, and a quarter-mile drag strip that hosts the annual NHRA Midwest Nationals event.

=== Entry list ===
- (R) denotes rookie driver

| # | Driver | Team | Make |
|---|---|---|---|
| 00 | Ryan Truex | Diamond-Waltrip Racing | Toyota |
| 01 | Mike Wallace | JD Motorsports | Chevrolet |
| 04 | Jeremy Clements | JD Motorsports | Chevrolet |
| 05 | Willie Allen | Day Enterprise Racing | Chevrolet |
| 6 | Ricky Stenhouse Jr. (R) | Roush Fenway Racing | Ford |
| 7 | Josh Wise | JR Motorsports | Chevrolet |
| 09 | Landon Cassill | RAB Racing | Ford |
| 10 | Tayler Malsam | Braun Racing | Toyota |
| 11 | Brian Scott (R) | Braun Racing | Toyota |
| 12 | Justin Allgaier | Penske Racing | Dodge |
| 15 | Michael Annett | Germain Racing | Toyota |
| 16 | Colin Braun (R) | Roush Fenway Racing | Ford |
| 18 | Brad Coleman | Joe Gibbs Racing | Toyota |
| 20 | Matt DiBenedetto | Joe Gibbs Racing | Toyota |
| 21 | Morgan Shepherd | Faith Motorsports | Chevrolet |
| 22 | Brad Keselowski | Penske Racing | Dodge |
| 23 | Alex Kennedy | R3 Motorsports | Chevrolet |
| 24 | Eric McClure | Team Rensi Motorsports | Ford |
| 26 | Brian Keselowski | K-Automotive Motorsports | Dodge |
| 27 | Kelly Bires | Baker Curb Racing | Ford |
| 28 | Kenny Wallace | Jay Robinson Racing | Chevrolet |
| 32 | Reed Sorenson | Braun Racing | Toyota |
| 33 | Kevin Harvick | Kevin Harvick Inc. | Chevrolet |
| 34 | Tony Raines | TriStar Motorsports | Chevrolet |
| 35 | Jason Keller | TriStar Motorsports | Chevrolet |
| 36 | Johnny Sauter | Front Row Motorsports | Chevrolet |
| 37 | Kevin Swindell | Baker Curb Racing | Ford |
| 38 | Jason Leffler | Braun Racing | Toyota |
| 40 | Mike Bliss | Key Motorsports | Chevrolet |
| 43 | Brad Baker | Baker Curb Racing | Ford |
| 49 | Mark Green | Jay Robinson Racing | Chevrolet |
| 52 | Chris Lawson | Means Racing | Chevrolet |
| 56 | Kevin Lepage | Mac Hill Motorsports | Chevrolet |
| 60 | Carl Edwards | Roush Fenway Racing | Ford |
| 62 | Brendan Gaughan | Rusty Wallace Racing | Toyota |
| 66 | Steve Wallace | Rusty Wallace Racing | Toyota |
| 70 | Shelby Howard | ML Motorsports | Chevrolet |
| 73 | Derrike Cope | Stratus Racing Group | Dodge |
| 81 | Michael McDowell | MacDonald Motorsports | Dodge |
| 87 | Joe Nemechek | NEMCO Motorsports | Chevrolet |
| 88 | Steve Arpin | JR Motorsports | Chevrolet |
| 89 | Johnny Chapman | Faith Motorsports | Chevrolet |
| 90 | Danny O'Quinn Jr. | D'Hondt Humphrey Motorsports | Chevrolet |
| 91 | Chase Miller | D'Hondt Humphrey Motorsports | Chevrolet |
| 92 | Dennis Setzer | K-Automotive Motorsports | Dodge |
| 98 | Paul Menard | Roush Fenway Racing | Ford |
| 99 | Trevor Bayne | Diamond-Waltrip Racing | Toyota |
Official Entry list

== Qualifying ==
Trevor Bayne won the pole with a time of 33.691 and a speed of 133.567.

| Grid | No. | Driver | Team | Manufacturer | Time | Speed |
|---|---|---|---|---|---|---|
| 1 | 99 | Trevor Bayne | Diamond-Waltrip Racing | Toyota | 33.691 | 133.567 |
| 2 | 16 | Colin Braun (R) | Roush Fenway Racing | Ford | 33.746 | 133.349 |
| 3 | 22 | Brad Keselowski | Penske Racing | Dodge | 33.769 | 133.258 |
| 4 | 62 | Brendan Gaughan | Rusty Wallace Racing | Toyota | 33.811 | 133.093 |
| 5 | 98 | Paul Menard | Roush Fenway Racing | Ford | 33.814 | 133.081 |
| 6 | 11 | Brian Scott (R) | Braun Racing | Toyota | 33.817 | 133.069 |
| 7 | 18 | Brad Coleman | Joe Gibbs Racing | Toyota | 33.930 | 132.626 |
| 8 | 60 | Carl Edwards | Roush Fenway Racing | Ford | 33.938 | 132.595 |
| 9 | 66 | Steve Wallace | Rusty Wallace Racing | Toyota | 33.971 | 132.466 |
| 10 | 33 | Kevin Harvick | Kevin Harvick Inc. | Chevrolet | 33.977 | 132.443 |
| 11 | 91 | Chase Miller | D'Hondt Humphrey Motorsports | Chevrolet | 34.000 | 132.353 |
| 12 | 70 | Shelby Howard | ML Motorsports | Chevrolet | 34.008 | 132.322 |
| 13 | 32 | Reed Sorenson | Braun Racing | Toyota | 34.027 | 132.248 |
| 14 | 37 | Kevin Swindell | Baker Curb Racing | Ford | 34.043 | 132.186 |
| 15 | 6 | Ricky Stenhouse Jr. (R) | Roush Fenway Racing | Ford | 34.076 | 132.058 |
| 16 | 12 | Justin Allgaier | Penske Racing | Dodge | 34.091 | 132.000 |
| 17 | 87 | Joe Nemechek | NEMCO Motorsports | Chevrolet | 34.102 | 131.957 |
| 18 | 20 | Matt DiBenedetto | Joe Gibbs Racing | Toyota | 34.150 | 131.772 |
| 19 | 00 | Ryan Truex | Diamond-Waltrip Racing | Toyota | 34.183 | 131.644 |
| 20 | 10 | Tayler Malsam | Braun Racing | Toyota | 34.259 | 131.352 |
| 21 | 05 | Willie Allen | Day Enterprise Racing | Chevrolet | 34.263 | 131.337 |
| 22 | 34 | Tony Raines | TriStar Motorsports | Chevrolet | 34.292 | 131.226 |
| 23 | 35 | Jason Keller | TriStar Motorsports | Chevrolet | 34.296 | 131.211 |
| 24 | 38 | Jason Leffler | Braun Racing | Toyota | 34.301 | 131.192 |
| 25 | 36 | Johnny Sauter | Front Row Motorsports | Chevrolet | 34.331 | 131.077 |
| 26 | 88 | Steve Arpin | JR Motorsports | Chevrolet | 34.357 | 130.978 |
| 27 | 26 | Brian Keselowski | K-Automotive Motorsports | Dodge | 34.362 | 130.959 |
| 28 | 90 | Danny O'Quinn Jr. | D'Hondt Humphrey Motorsports | Chevrolet | 34.366 | 130.943 |
| 29 | 27 | Kelly Bires | Baker Curb Racing | Ford | 34.369 | 130.932 |
| 30 | 49 | Mark Green | Jay Robinson Racing | Chevrolet | 34.376 | 130.905 |
| 31 | 56 | Kevin Lepage | Mac Hill Motorsports | Chevrolet | 34.392 | 130.844 |
| 32 | 28 | Kenny Wallace | Jay Robinson Racing | Chevrolet | 34.406 | 130.791 |
| 33 | 15 | Michael Annett | Germain Racing | Toyota | 34.430 | 130.700 |
| 34 | 7 | Josh Wise | JR Motorsports | Chevrolet | 34.433 | 130.689 |
| 35 | 89 | Johnny Chapman | Faith Motorsports | Chevrolet | 34.438 | 130.670 |
| 36 | 92 | Dennis Setzer | K-Automotive Motorsports | Dodge | 34.451 | 130.620 |
| 37 | 01 | Mike Wallace | JD Motorsports | Chevrolet | 34.470 | 130.548 |
| 38 | 09 | Landon Cassill | RAB Racing | Ford | 34.487 | 130.484 |
| 39 | 40 | Mike Bliss | Key Motorsports | Chevrolet | 34.548 | 130.254 |
| 40 | 43 | Brad Baker* | Baker Curb Racing | Ford | 34.684 | 129.743 |
| 41 | 21 | Morgan Shepherd* | Faith Motorsports | Chevrolet | 34.691 | 129.717 |
| 42 | 23 | Alex Kennedy* | R3 Motorsports | Chevrolet | 34.735 | 129.552 |
| 43 | 24 | Eric McClure | Team Rensi Motorsports | Ford | 34.485 | 130.492 |
Failed to qualify, withdrew, or driver changes
| 44 | 52 | Chris Lawson | Means Racing | Chevrolet | 34.544 | 130.269 |
| 45 | 73 | Derrike Cope | Stratus Racing Group | Dodge | 34.619 | 129.986 |
| 46 | 04 | Jeremy Clements | JD Motorsports | Chevrolet | 34.926 | 128.844 |
| 47 | 81 | Michael McDowell | MacDonald Motorsports | Dodge | 34.975 | 128.663 |
Official Starting grid

* - Made the field via owner's points.

== Race ==
Pole sitter Trevor Bayne led the first lap of the race. On lap 3, Brad Keselowski took the lead and held on to it. The first caution would fly on lap 45 for debris. During the caution, the right rear tire of Jason Keller's car blew and completely shredded the whole right rear side of his car. Trevor Bayne won the race off of pit road and he led the field to the restart on lap 52. On the restart, Brad Keselowski took the lead from Bayne. Eventually, green flag pitstops would begin around lap 115. On lap 120, Carl Edwards took the lead from Keselowski. On lap 121, both Edwards and Keselowski went to pit but Keselowski tried to pass Edwards in the pit road entry lane but pushed the car too fast and ended up going up to the grass and spinning out. No caution flew as Keselowski was able to get it out of harms way and get back going again. After everything cycled through, Kevin Harvick was the new leader. On lap 128, Carl Edwards took the lead.

=== Final laps and post-race feud ===
On lap 142, Brad Keselowski took the lead from Edwards. On lap 143, the second caution would fly for debris. Brad Keselowski won the race off of pit road and he led the field to the restart on lap 148. On the restart, Carl Edwards took the lead. With 50 laps to go, the third caution would fly for a strange crash that involved teammates. On the previous lap, Matt DiBenedetto hit the backstretch wall with the right rear and ended up cutting a tire. DiBenedetto tried to nurse it around another lap and make it to pit road but his car got loose in turns 1 and 2 and he ended up sliding down across the track and right in front of his teammate Brad Coleman who t-boned DiBenedetto ending both of their races. The race would restart with 40 laps to go with Edwards leading. Brad Keselowski attempted to take the lead from Edwards for multiple laps since with 38 to go before he finally passed him with 32 to go and took the lead. With 22 to go, the 4th caution would fly when Ryan Truex crashed in turns 1 and 2. Brad Keselowski won the race off of pit road but Trevor Bayne, Reed Sorenson, Ricky Stenhouse Jr., Shelby Howard, and Brian Scott did not pit and Bayne led the field to the restart with 17 laps to go. With 13 laps to go, the 5th caution would fly when Kevin Harvick got loose off of turn 2 and hit the outside wall. The race would restart with 8 laps to go. On the restart, Brad Keselowski took the lead from Bayne. Keselowski was looking for his 4th win of the season. But with 6 laps to go, the 6th and final caution would fly when Justin Allgaier hit the backstretch wall and ended up cutting a tire that slowed him down in the middle of the pack before he was rear ended by Tayler Malsam and both spun in turn 4 and collected Joe Nemechek. The race was red flagged for a short bit for the wreck. The wreck would set up a two lap shootout without a green-white-checkered to extend the race. On the restart, Keselowski took the lead but Edwards was not going to give up and fought back on Keselowski's outside. Edwards took the lead and took the white flag. On the last lap, Keselowski got to the inside of Edwards but entered to corner too fast and drifted up into Edwards getting Edwards loose. The two raced side by side and down the backstretch and looked like was going to be a close finish. Keselowski just got out in front of Edwards off of turn 4 and looked like Keselowski was gonna win. Unfortunately, Edwards turned down and wrecked Keselowski turning Keselowski into the outside wall. Edwards caused a 8 car wreck down the frontstretch in a very hard wreck. After Keselowski hit the outside wall, Keselowski spun down the track into the inside wall where he clipped Colin Braun. Keselowski hit the inside wall, turned around 180 degrees short of the finish line, and got blasted in the right front and left rear by Shelby Howard and Steve Arpin that made Keselowski's car spin around 3 times and totaled his car but got his car across the start-finish line in 14th place. The wreck collected Brad Keselowski, Carl Edwards, Colin Braun, Shelby Howard, Steve Arpin, Jason Leffler, Tayler Malsam, and Alex Kennedy.

Edwards ran away with the win and would be Edwards' second of the season. Reed Sorenson, Trevor Bayne, Paul Menard, and Steve Wallace rounded out the top 5 while Brian Scott, Colin Braun, Josh Wise, Ricky Stenhouse Jr., and Tony Raines rounded out the top 10. The wreck between Edwards and Keselowski continued the feud between the two drivers that started in the 2009 Aaron's 499 at Talladega Superspeedway when Keselowski wrecked Edwards on the last lap for the win. In his post-race interview, Edwards said "I just couldn't let him take the win from me. My guys work way too hard for that. We had a great restart. My guys built me a great car. We came to the checkered flag, and I hate to see stuff tore up, but we came here to win and he took it from us there in Turn 1. Just an awesome race. ... I’m sure some of them don’t like that win—Brad Keselowski fans and stuff—but, man, I just couldn’t let him take it from me. I had to do what I had to do." Keselowski said from his point of view that Edwards "turned left into me and wrecked me on purpose. I gave him the lane, and he still wrecked me. ... I figured out a way to beat him. He wasn't happy with me, so he wrecked me. Wrecking down the straightaway is never cool, whether it’s at 200 mph or 120. I'm sorry that's the way it had to end." Eventually, the rivalry took another turn when Brad's father Bob Keselowski got interviewed. Bob was upset with Edwards and said "Brad got into Carl getting out in turn 1 racing. They bump, they rub, typical rubbing racing deal. Carl went and flipped out like he did at Atlanta trying to kill the kid." as he was referring to when Edwards flipped Keselowski in the Cup race at Atlanta earlier that year. Bob also quoted "I'm sick and tired of this. I'll get my own damn uniform back on and take care of this. He ain't gonna kill my boy." Eventually, NASCAR intervened on both Edwards and Keselowski. Both drivers were put on probation until the end of the year and Edwards was fined $25,000 and docked 60 drivers points. Keselowski would eventually get the last laugh as he won the Nationwide Series championship by 445 points over Edwards.

== Race results ==
| Pos | Car | Driver | Team | Manufacturer | Laps Run | Laps Led | Status | Points |
|---|---|---|---|---|---|---|---|---|
| 1 | 60 | Carl Edwards (Note: Edwards was docked 60 drivers points for wrecking Keselowski) | Roush Fenway Racing | Ford | 200 | 39 | running | 130 |
| 2 | 32 | Reed Sorenson | Braun Racing | Toyota | 200 | 0 | running | 170 |
| 3 | 99 | Trevor Bayne | Diamond-Waltrip Racing | Toyota | 200 | 19 | running | 170 |
| 4 | 98 | Paul Menard | Roush Fenway Racing | Ford | 200 | 0 | running | 160 |
| 5 | 66 | Steve Wallace | Rusty Wallace Racing | Toyota | 200 | 0 | running | 155 |
| 6 | 11 | Brian Scott (R) | Braun Racing | Toyota | 200 | 0 | running | 150 |
| 7 | 16 | Colin Braun (R) | Roush Fenway Racing | Ford | 200 | 0 | running | 146 |
| 8 | 7 | Josh Wise | JR Motorsports | Chevrolet | 200 | 0 | running | 142 |
| 9 | 6 | Ricky Stenhouse Jr. (R) | Roush Fenway Racing | Ford | 200 | 0 | running | 138 |
| 10 | 34 | Tony Raines | TriStar Motorsports | Chevrolet | 200 | 0 | running | 134 |
| 11 | 15 | Michael Annett | Germain Racing | Toyota | 200 | 0 | running | 130 |
| 12 | 70 | Shelby Howard | ML Motorsports | Chevrolet | 200 | 0 | running | 127 |
| 13 | 88 | Steve Arpin | JR Motorsports | Chevrolet | 200 | 0 | running | 124 |
| 14 | 22 | Brad Keselowski | Penske Racing | Dodge | 200 | 136 | running | 131 |
| 15 | 05 | Willie Allen | Day Enterprise Racing | Chevrolet | 200 | 0 | running | 118 |
| 16 | 33 | Kevin Harvick | Kevin Harvick Inc. | Chevrolet | 200 | 6 | running | 120 |
| 17 | 62 | Brendan Gaughan | Rusty Wallace Racing | Toyota | 198 | 0 | running | 112 |
| 18 | 10 | Tayler Malsam | Braun Racing | Toyota | 198 | 0 | running | 109 |
| 19 | 40 | Mike Bliss | Key Motorsports | Chevrolet | 198 | 0 | running | 106 |
| 20 | 28 | Kenny Wallace | Jay Robinson Racing | Chevrolet | 198 | 0 | running | 103 |
| 21 | 21 | Morgan Shepherd | Faith Motorsports | Chevrolet | 197 | 0 | running | 100 |
| 22 | 01 | Mike Wallace | JD Motorsports | Chevrolet | 197 | 0 | running | 97 |
| 23 | 38 | Jason Leffler | Braun Racing | Toyota | 196 | 0 | running | 94 |
| 24 | 23 | Alex Kennedy | R3 Motorsports | Chevrolet | 196 | 0 | running | 91 |
| 25 | 12 | Justin Allgaier | Penske Racing | Dodge | 194 | 0 | crash | 88 |
| 26 | 24 | Eric McClure | Team Rensi Motorsports | Ford | 193 | 0 | running | 85 |
| 27 | 87 | Joe Nemechek | NEMCO Motorsports | Chevrolet | 189 | 0 | crash | 82 |
| 28 | 00 | Ryan Truex | Diamond-Waltrip Racing | Toyota | 178 | 0 | crash | 79 |
| 29 | 20 | Matt DiBenedetto | Joe Gibbs Racing | Toyota | 163 | 0 | running | 76 |
| 30 | 18 | Brad Coleman | Joe Gibbs Racing | Toyota | 150 | 0 | crash | 73 |
| 31 | 09 | Landon Cassill | RAB Racing | Ford | 102 | 0 | vibration | 70 |
| 32 | 27 | Kelly Bires | Baker Curb Racing | Ford | 62 | 0 | engine | 67 |
| 33 | 43 | Brad Baker | Baker Curb Racing | Ford | 61 | 0 | brakes | 64 |
| 34 | 35 | Jason Keller | TriStar Motorsports | Chevrolet | 44 | 0 | crash | 61 |
| 35 | 56 | Kevin Lepage | Mac Hill Motorsports | Chevrolet | 26 | 0 | ignition | 58 |
| 36 | 91 | Chase Miller | D'Hondt Humphrey Motorsports | Chevrolet | 24 | 0 | electrical | 55 |
| 37 | 90 | Danny O'Quinn Jr. | D'Hondt Humphrey Motorsports | Chevrolet | 20 | 0 | vibration | 52 |
| 38 | 26 | Brian Keselowski | K-Automotive Motorsports | Dodge | 13 | 0 | brakes | 49 |
| 39 | 37 | Kevin Swindell | Baker Curb Racing | Ford | 8 | 0 | brakes | 46 |
| 40 | 89 | Johnny Chapman | Faith Motorsports | Chevrolet | 6 | 0 | oil pressure | 43 |
| 41 | 36 | Johnny Sauter | Front Row Motorsports | Chevrolet | 4 | 0 | electrical | 40 |
| 42 | 92 | Dennis Setzer | K-Automotive Motorsports | Dodge | 3 | 0 | vibration | 37 |
| 43 | 49 | Mark Green | Jay Robinson Racing | Chevrolet | 2 | 0 | electrical | 34 |
Official Race results

== Notes ==
| Previous race: 2010 Dollar General 300 | NASCAR Nationwide Series; 2010 season | Next race: 2010 Kroger 200 |
