= Steve Arpin =

Canadian racing driver

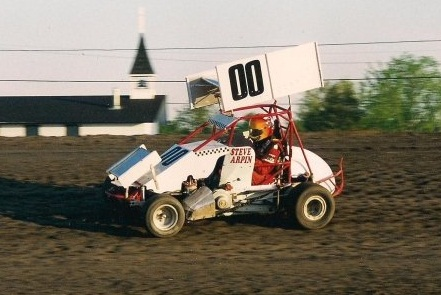
- Arpin at Emo Speedway in 1997
- Born: December 16, 1983 (age 42); Fort Frances, Ontario, Canada
- Awards: 2009, 2010 ARCA Racing Series Most Popular Driver; 2008 USAC Silver Crown Rookie of the Year

NASCAR O'Reilly Auto Parts Series career
- 9 races run over 2 years
- 2012 position: 54th
- Best finish: 54th (2012)
- First race: 2010 Aaron's 312 (Talladega)
- Last race: 2012 Pioneer Hi-Bred 250 (Iowa)
Wins	Top tens	Poles
0	2	0

NASCAR FedEx Freight Truck Series career
- 5 races run over 1 year
- Best finish: 32nd (2011)
- First race: 2009 WinStar World Casino 400K (Texas)
- Last race: 2011 Fast Five 225 (Joliet)
Wins	Top tens	Poles
0	0	1

Global Rallycross career
- Debut season: 2013
- Current team: Loenbro Motorsports
- Car number: 00
- Former teams: Chip Ganassi Racing; OMSE2
- Starts: 54
- Wins: 3
- Podiums: 13
- Best finish: 3rd in 2017
Medal record
Representing Canada
Summer X Games
Silver medal – second place	2015 Austin	RallyCross
- Statistics up to date as of March 22, 2023.

Stephen Arpin (born December 16, 1983) is a Canadian race car driver and entrepreneur. He currently competes part-time UMP Dirt Modifieds in the No. 00EH Longhorn Chassis. He has also previously raced in the ARCA Menards Series, NASCAR Craftsman Truck Series and NASCAR O'Reilly Auto Parts Series. He currently owns Longhorn Chassis a Dirt Late Model and Dirt Modified chassis manufacturer.

== Racing career ==
=== Early career ===
Arpin was born in Fort Frances, Ontario. He made his racing debut in Go-Karts at Riverside Speedway in Rainy River, Ontario at the age of ten. He won several races as a rookie and was at the top of the standings most of his karting career. By the age of 14, Arpin started racing Mini-Sprints at the Emo Speedway in 1997. The following year, he moved straight to WISSOTA Modifieds and, in 1999, took the track championship in the class. After finishing second in track standings in 2000, Arpin returned to the top in 2001 by winning every feature event at the track, claiming his second track championship in three years. He won the majority of races in 2002, just missing his third championship.

=== NASCAR ===
It was announced in the summer of 2010 that Arpin would drive the No. 7 Chevy for JR Motorsports in a limited schedule, as a fill-in for Danica Patrick. Talks with JRM's owner Dale Earnhardt Jr. started in 2009. This was made public during the Rattlesnake 150 ARCA event, which Arpin won. Arpin made his first start in that summer at the Aaron's 312, where he was competitive until being caught in a wreck late in the event. His first top-ten finish came in the 2010 Subway Jalapeño 250 powered by Coca-Cola with a tenth-place finish.

In 2011, Arpin made his NASCAR Camping World Truck Series debut at Texas Motor Speedway, driving the No. 32 Mike's Hard Lemonade Chevrolet Silverado for Turner Motorsports.

In 2012, Arpin competed in two Nationwide races for Turner, at Texas and Iowa Speedway. Aprin finished tenth and 16th respectively. Arpin also returned to the ARCA Racing Series with Venturini Motorsports at both Elko Speedway and Springfield.

=== Global RallyCross Championship ===
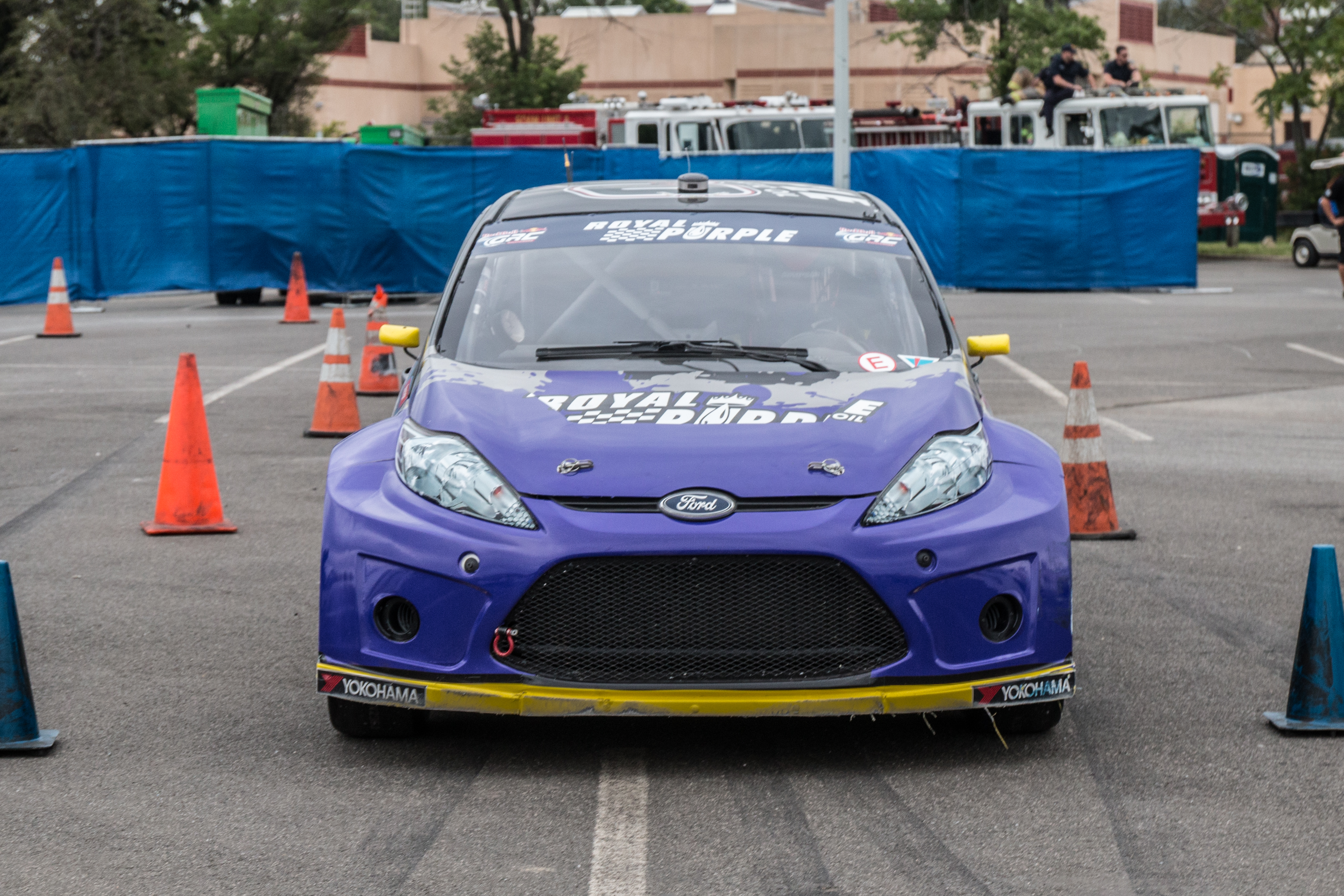
Arpin's 2014 car

For 2013, Arpin received the opportunity to compete for the Global Rallycross Championship alongside teammate, fellow NASCAR competitor Scott Speed.

In 2015, Arpin was signed by Chip Ganassi Racing to compete full-time in the GRC.

=== Dirt track racing ===
In 2002, Arpin began to increase his travels throughout the United States, especially in Minnesota. At the age of 18, he took the feature win at the Silver 1000 in Proctor, Minnesota and the WISSOTA 100 at Cedar Lake Speedway which garnered him large attention in the WISSOTA region. Arpin also won the largest modified race east of the Mississippi at Brushcreek Motorsports Complex, the American Heritage classic. For winning the Heritage Classic, he won a Harley-Davidson Soft Tail motorcycle.

=== Snowmobile oval racing ===
In his early teens, Arpin also raced snowmobiles during the winter. He won several events at the local scene and was picked up shortly thereafter by Polaris Industries, becoming the youngest driver to ever compete for the company. Throughout his time of snowmobiles, he captured three world championships, four Polaris championships, and many feature wins.

=== Americas Rallycross Championship ===
In 2018, Arpin and Loenbro Motorsports competed in the 2018 ARX season. He finished sixth in total points at the end of the season.

In 2019, Arpin Arpin and Loenbro Motorsports along his new teammate Travis Pecoy. Arpin finished fourth in total points at the end of the season.

== Accomplishments ==
=== ARCA Re/Max Series ===
- 2010 Most Popular Driver Award
- 2010 Southern Illinois 100 at DuQuoin Dirt Race Winner
- 2010 Rattlesnake 150 at Texas Motor Speedway Race Winner
- 2010 Kentuckiana Ford Dealers 200 Race Winner
- 2009 Most Popular Driver Award

=== USAC Silver Crown Series ===
- 2008 Rookie of the Year

=== Dirt track racing ===
- 2008 Minnesota Modified Nationals Champion
- 2007 18 Feature Wins & 42 top 5 finishes in an open wheel modified throughout the United States.
- 2007 Fall Modified Nationals (Day 1) Champion
- 2007 WISSOTA Heartland Nationals Champion – Deer Creek Speedway
- 2007 Memorial Day Special Champion – Rice Lake Speedway
- 2007 101 American Heritage Classic Champion – Brushcreek Motorsports Complex
- 2007 IMCA Dakota Classic Modified Tour Champion – Won Every Heat & Feature (5 Nights)
- 2007 North Florida Nationals Champion – Lake City, FL
- 2007 Florida DIRTcar WinterNationals UMP Modified Points Champion
- 2006 United States Modified Touring Series Featherlite Fall Jamboree Champion
- 2006 17 Feature Wins in an open wheel Modified throughout the United States
- 2006 Coca-Cola Young Guns Shoot-out Champion – Savannah, Georgia
- 2006 Carolina Clash Champion – Cedar Lake Speedway, Wisconsin
- 2005 Deer Creek Speedway Sportsman of the Year
- 2004 Gopher 50 Charity Race Champion
- 2004 8th Place WISSOTA National Points
- 2004 Cedar Lake Speedway Overall Hard Charger Award
- 2003 Rice Lake Speedway Labor Day Special Champion
- 2002 Cedar Lake Speedway WISSOTA 100 Champion
- 2002 Emo Speedway Driver of the Year and Sportsman of the Year
- 2002 Proctor Speedway Silver 1000 Feature Winner
- 2001 Emo Speedway WISSOTA Modifieds Track Champion
- 2001 Emo Speedway Driver of the Year / Sportsman of the Year
- 2001 Emo Speedway Winner of Every feature Event
- 1999 Emo Speedway WISSOTA Modifieds Track Champion

=== Snowmobile oval racing ===
- 2002 Eagle River World Championship Pro Stock 600 Champion
- 2002 Polaris Industries Pro Stock 440 Champion
- 2002 Polaris Industries Pro Stock 600 Champion
- 2002 Polaris Industries Woody's Triple Crown Champion
- 2001 Polaris Industries Pro Open Champion
- 2001 Eagle River World Championships Pro Stock 440 Champion
- 2001 Eagle River World Championships Pro Stock 600 Champion

== Motorsports career results ==
=== NASCAR ===
(key) (Bold – Pole position awarded by qualifying time. Italics – Pole position earned by points standings or practice time. * – Most laps led.)

==== Nationwide Series ====
NASCAR Nationwide Series results
Year	Team	No.	Make	1	2	3	4	5	6	7	8	9	10	11	12	13	14	15	16	17	18	19	20	21	22	23	24	25	26	27	28	29	30	31	32	33	34	NNSC	Pts	Ref
2010	JR Motorsports	7	Chevy	DAY	CAL	LVS	BRI	NSH	PHO	TEX	TAL; 26	RCH; 25	DAR; 29	DOV	CLT; 34	NSH	KEN	NHA	DAY; 10	CHI																		59th	677	
2010	JR Motorsports	88	Chevy																		GTY; 13	IRP	IOW; 18	GLN	MCH	BRI	CGV	ATL	RCH	DOV	KAN	CAL	CLT	GTY	TEX	PHO	HOM	59th	677	
2012	Turner Scott Motorsports	30	Chevy	DAY	PHO	LVS	BRI	CAL	TEX; 10	RCH	TAL	DAR	IOW; 16	CLT	DOV	MCH	ROA	KEN	DAY	NHA	CHI	IND	IOW	GLN	CGV	BRI	ATL	RCH	CHI	KEN	DOV	CLT	KAN	TEX	PHO	HOM		54th	62	

==== Camping World Truck Series ====
NASCAR Camping World Truck Series results
Year	Team	No.	Make	1	2	3	4	5	6	7	8	9	10	11	12	13	14	15	16	17	18	19	20	21	22	23	24	25	NCWTC	Pts	Ref
2011	Turner Motorsports	32	Chevy	DAY	PHO	DAR	MAR	NSH	DOV	CLT	KAN	TEX; 23	KEN; 12	IOW; 13	NSH	IRP; 13	POC	MCH	BRI	ATL	**CHI**; 16	NHA	KEN	LVS	TAL	MAR	TEX	HOM	32nd	144	

=== ARCA Racing Series ===
(key) (Bold – Pole position awarded by qualifying time. Italics – Pole position earned by points standings or practice time. * – Most laps led.)

ARCA Racing Series results
Year	Team	No.	Make	1	2	3	4	5	6	7	8	9	10	11	12	13	14	15	16	17	18	19	20	21	ARSC	Pts	Ref
2009	Eddie Sharp Racing	20	Toyota	DAY; 26	SLM; 17	CAR; 10	TAL; 11	KEN; 29	TOL; 21	POC; 11	MCH; 8	MFD; 5	IOW; 8	KEN; 6	BLN; 11										7th	4575	
2009	Venturini Motorsports	25	Toyota													POC; 4		CHI; 36							7th	4575	
2009	Venturini Motorsports	25	Chevy														ISF; 5		TOL; 10	DSF; 9	NJE; 32	SLM; 5		CAR; 34	7th	4575	
2009	Venturini Motorsports	15	Toyota																				KAN; 8		7th	4575	
2010	Venturini Motorsports	55	Toyota	DAY; 10				TAL; 14	TOL; 23			IOW; 28	MFD	POC	BLN; 3	NJE; 9		CHI; 2		TOL; 16		KAN; 2			12th	3735	
2010	Venturini Motorsports	55	Chevy		PBE; 5	SLM; 1*	TEX; 1			POC; 11	MCH; 33						**ISF**; 7		DSF; 1*		SLM; 20		CAR; 12		12th	3735	
2011	Venturini Motorsports	25	Toyota	DAY; 32	TAL	SLM	TOL	NJE	CHI	POC	MCH	WIN	BLN	IOW	IRP	POC	ISF	MAD	DSF	SLM	KAN	TOL			152nd	75	
2012	Venturini Motorsports	66	Chevy	DAY	MOB	SLM	TAL	TOL	ELK; 12	POC	MCH	WIN	NJE	IOW	CHI	IRP	POC	BLN							77th	250	
2012	Venturini Motorsports	15	Chevy																ISF; 30	MAD	SLM	DSF	KAN		77th	250	

=== Complete Global RallyCross Championship results ===
(key)

==== Supercar ====
Year	Entrant	Car	1	2	3	4	5	6	7	8	9	10	11	12	GRC	Points
2013	OMSE2	Ford Fiesta ST	BRA; 4	MUN1; 11	MUN2; 5	LOU; 12	BRI; 6	IRW; 14	ATL; 9	CHA; 5	LV; 8				8th	79
2014	OMSE2	Ford Fiesta ST	BAR; 2	AUS; 10	DC; 4	NY; 5	CHA; 7	DAY; 12	LA1; 7	LA2; 12	SEA; 11	LV; 8			7th	224
2015	Chip Ganassi Racing	Ford Fiesta ST	FTA; 7	DAY1; 5	DAY2; 3	MCAS; 5	DET1; 7	DET2; 11	DC; 4	LA1; 5	LA2; 5	BAR1; 8	BAR2; 4	LV; 4	6th	357
2016	Chip Ganassi Racing	Ford Fiesta ST	PHO1; 4	PHO2; 5	DAL; 2	DAY1; 1	DAY2; 6	MCAS1; 3	MCAS2; C	DC; 6	AC; 5	SEA; 5	LA1; 3	LA2; 10	4th	461
2017	Loenbro Motorsports	Ford Fiesta ST	MEM; 3	LOU; 2	THO1; 4	THO2; 1	OTT1; 1	OTT2; 10	INDY; 3	AC1; 3	AC2; 3	SEA1; 4	SEA2; 7	LA; 5	3rd	743

=== Complete Americas Rallycross Championship results ===
(key)

==== Supercar ====
Year	Entrant	Car	1	2	3	4	5	6	Pos	Points
2018	Hoonigan Racing Division	Ford Focus RS RX	SIL	COA; 7	TRO; 6	COA; 3			6th	54
2019	Loenbro Motorsports	Ford Fiesta ST	MOH; 3	GTW; 2	GTW; 5	TRO; 6	COA; 3	MOH; 2	4th	124
