= Don May =

Don, Donnie, or Donald May may refer to:

- Donald May (1929–2022), American actor
- Don May (politician) (1924–2001), Australian state legislator
- Don May (footballer) (born 1931), English footballer, see Bury F.C. players
- Don May (basketball) (born 1946), American small forward
- Donnie May (born 1966), Canadian stock car racer in Emo Speedway Championships
- Don May, Jr. (born 1967), American producer of video documentaries, founder of Synapse Films

== See also ==
- May (surname)
