= CKWO-FM =

- Wauzhushk Onigum, Ontario; Canada
- Broadcast area: Kenora, Ontario
- Frequency: 101.3 MHz
- Branding: 101.3 The Gap

Programming
- Format: Pop rock, community radio

Ownership
- Owner: WONation Radio Inc.

History
- First air date: 2024
- Call sign meaning: Wauzhushk Onigum

Technical information
- Class: LP
- ERP: 50 watts
- HAAT: 17.8 metres (58 ft)

Links
- Website: https://1013thegap.ca/

CKWO-FM (101.3 FM) is a Canadian radio station that airs pop rock and First Nations community radio programming broadcasting at 101.3 FM in Wauzhushk Onigum, Ontario in the Kenora area. The station is known on the air as The Gap, which began broadcasting in 2024 and is owned by WONation Radio Inc.

== History ==
On October 12, 2022, WONation Radio Inc. received a license from the CRTC to operate a low-power, English and Ojibway-language Indigenous (Type B Native) FM radio station in Wauzhushk Onigum Nation, District of Kenora, Ontario which would operate at 101.3 MHz (channel 267LP) with an average effective radiated power (ERP) of 27 watts (directional antenna with a maximum ERP of 50 watts with an effective height of antenna above average terrain [EHAAT] of 17.8 metres).

CKWO-FM signed on at 101.3 FM in May 2024 as The Gap.

== CKWO-FM 92.3 ==
The CKWO-FM call sign was previously used at a former radio station in Fort Frances, Ontario which operated an Active rock aboriginal/First Nations community radio on the frequency of 92.3 MHz with 50 watts, branded as The Wolf. The station was launched by Couchiching Community Radio in 2004. It is unknown when the station ceased broadcasting; the CRTC renewed CKWO-FM's licence from 1 September 2012 to 28 February 2013, with no record of renewal from that date.
