= Fort Frances Canadian Bass Championship =

Fishing tournament in Ontario, Canada

The Fort Frances Canadian Bass Championship is a catch and release smallmouth bass fishing tournament held on Rainy Lake and hosted in Fort Frances, Ontario, Canada. The annual tournament was first held in 1995, and the tournament continues to takes place each July.

== History ==
The idea of a catch and release smallmouth bass tournament on Rainy Lake first surfaced after the In-Fisherman Professional Walleye Trail held its first annual championship on Rainy Lake in the fall of 1990. Many of the anglers that fished that walleye tournament were amazed with the quality of the smallmouth bass fishery on Rainy Lake.

In April 1994, a meeting hosted by Lionel Robert of Weighmaster Tournament Systems was held in the Fort Frances Town Hall Committee Room. The feasibility of hosting a smallmouth tournament was discussed with attendees that included the Rendezvous Trail, The Kenora Bass International, the Fort Frances Chamber of Commerce, the Fort Frances Downtown Business Improvement Area, the Fort Frances Economic Development Office, the Ministry of Natural Resources, area business owners, tourist camp operators and anglers.

Discussion at that meeting lead to the Rendezvous Trail working with Lionel Robert during the summer of 1994 to lay the foundation of the first tournament scheduled for the last week of July 1995.

In August 1994 the Town of Fort Frances and the Rendezvous Trail sponsored a representative to report on the Kenora Bass International, which at that time was in its seventh year.

Planning proceeded for the inaugural tournament during the fall and winter of 1994/95 with the Rendezvous Trail using the tournament as an opportunity to promote Fort Frances and Rainy Lake as a tourist destination.

In spring of 1995 a community involvement meeting was held. That meeting resulted in local businesses coming forward to sponsor the inaugural Fort Frances Canadian Bass Championship.

The tournament was cancelled in 2020 due to the COVID-19 pandemic, but returned in 2021.

== First tournament ==
The first tournament featured 47 teams. The tournament was the subject of a 30-minute episode of Don Lamont’s syndicated fishing show The Complete Angler. In spite of not attracting the hoped-for number of entries and not turning a profit the event was a success.

In the late fall of 1995 the Ontario provincial government withdrew support for local tourist organizations and it became apparent that the Rendezvous Trail would not continue to remain active. The tournament was spun off from the founding organization and early in 1996 Fort Frances Canadian Bass Championship Inc. was created as a non-profit corporation.

The new group had eleven board members with each board member being responsible for an area of activity. Three of the 1996 board members had been involved in the previous year. Early in the planning the new board realized that they had five groups that required special attention. These groups are the volunteers, the tournament sponsors, the anglers, the spectators and the fish.

The second tournament has 69 competing teams; an increase of 47%. Some of the highlights of the 1996 tournament were over 450 volunteers, increased daytime activities and family entertainment, Pathways to Fishing angling workshops for kids and the introduction of the Reel Raffle. The Big Screen Tournament Information System, the Parade of Boats and the Kiwanis Steak fry also debuted in 1996. That year was also the first time that the top teams were brought through the tent in their boats during the Day Three weigh-in.

The 1996 tournament was highlighted in an eight-page feature in the Fishing 97 issue of Outdoors Canada. Gord Pyzer of Kenora, a tournament angler, fishing educator and outdoor writer, authored the article.

Following the completion of the 1996 tournament the In-Fisherman Communication Network contacted the Fort Frances Canadian Bass Championship. They wanted to use the new Big Screen Tournament Information System for the 1996 In-Fisherman Professional Walleye Trail Championship. The system designer and the computer committee chair delivered a modified system in less than one month. This was the start of a long-term relationship with in-Fisherman.

Rainy Lake, the Fort Frances Canadian Bass Championship, its competing anglers and their tournament fishing techniques and tactics have been featured on In-Fisherman television shows and in magazine articles.

Al Lindner, co-founder of In-Fisherman, has stated that Rainy Lake is his favourite smallmouth fishing destination.

Planning for the 1997 tournament started after the completion of the second event. The third tournament, in 1997, had 104 teams competing. An addition was purchased for the Rendezvous Trail Special Event Tent to help accommodate the increasing number of spectators and anglers. A second catch and release boat was added to ensure that the increasing number of fish weighed could be returned safely to Rainy Lake. In its second year the Reel Raffle, with 5000 tickets, was a sellout. In-Fisherman had TV crews filming the event for shows on tournaments and tournament tactics.

A tournament internet site was created in 1997 to share tournament information on the Internet. The address of the site is www.canadianbass.com. In 1997 the BIA decorated downtown Fort Frances with banners proclaiming the tournament. The economic impact of the 1997 tournament was estimated at over 2.5 million dollars.

The fourth tournament, held in 1998, was the first Fort Frances Canadian Bass Championship that had a full field of 130 teams, with 15 additional teams on the waiting list. The KidPro event was added in 1998 to allow local youngsters the opportunity to fish with tournament anglers and the Big Screen Tournament Information System now had two screens. A Much Music Night was added for older kids in 1998.

Tournament organizers were featured on a live radio interview on a Chicago radio station outdoor store. More free family entertainment was added. In 1998 the number of volunteer reached almost 500 and there were 117 tournament sponsors.

In 1999 a full field of 130 teams competed for $120,000 in prizes. 1999 was a year of change for the Fort Frances Canadian Bass Championship when the fishing days were moved from Friday, Saturday and Sunday to Thursday, Friday and Saturday.

The Angler Advisory Committee was formed in 1999. This group is made up of a cross section of tournament anglers and they are consulted on matters that affect anglers. New holding tanks and a customized aeration system were implemented in 1999 to improve fish care.

== 2000 tournament ==
In an effort to be able to receive entries from new teams a revised method of accepting entries was implemented for the 2000 tournament. Teams finishing in the top ninety in 1999 were offered a spot in the 2000 tournament field and the balance of the field (40) would be filled by draw. Ninety-five teams entered the draw for those 40 spots.

In 2000 Fort Frances Canadian Bass Championship worked with CBQ Thunder Bay in a regional contest that extended the field by one team. That team was composed of a CBQ radio host and the contest winner, a young man from Manitouwadge. 2000 saw changes: the number of flights were changed from four to five to decrease congestion during the weigh-in, the KidPro was moved to the Sunday before the tournament, the first big sign was erected at the tournament site. The 2000 tournament was covered by TSN and the first local champions were crowned.

In 2001 130 teams competed for $130,000. New Big Screen Software was introduced, the selling of souvenirs was tendered out, a 24 foot section was added to the tent to make room for growing crowds, bleachers were added for additional seating and a big map joined the big sign at the Sorting Gap Marina parking lot. Quest for the Best returned after taking a year off. The Hawg Trough returned. The docks were decorated with flags and the Walk of Fame celebrated previous winners. The second local champion was crowned. First place, second place and third place teams featured local anglers.

In August 2001 the position of O-Fish-L Angler Ambassador was created. The criterion was that the title would be bestowed upon a competing angler who has made and continues to make a significant contribution to the promotion of the Fort Frances Canadian Bass Championship and the advancement or Rainy Lake, Fort Frances and the Rainy River District as an angling and vacation destination. Al Lindner was appointed to the position of O-Fish-L Angler Ambassador.

For 2002 the field of the Fort Frances Canadian Bass Championship was expanded to include the winners from six regional tournaments. 2001 Winning teams from the Castin’ for Cash on Lake Despair, Kenora Bass International, Sioux Narrows Bassin’ for Bucks, Morson Bass Classic, Atikokan Bass Classic and the Rainy Lake Fall Bass Classic were offered spots. This increased the field to 133 teams for 2002.

In 2002 a third Catch and Release Boat was added to ensure that the increasing number of fish weighed could be returned to Rainy Lake safely. Daytime Land was created in the grassy area to the west of the north parking lot. Bobber was born, a seven-foot bascott was acquired and quickly became a crowd favourite. An additional fundraiser was created to help offset rising costs with the introduction of Bobber’s Big Bass Bargains. This Penny Table had prizes for every age group.

Also in 2002 a Fort Frances Canadian Bass Tournament Bursary was created. It was awarded to a graduate of Fort Frances High School who was going on to studies in the sciences in a Canadian University.

In 2003 the field was expanded to 136 teams and the winning teams of the six regional tournaments were again offered spots. An ever-growing event prompted the growth of Daytime Land and the addition of a Food Court. Five local food vendors joined Safeway in providing food for the crowds. A second stage was added for Kids’ Activities and the weigh-ins were broadcast live on the internet.

The tenth championship team was crowned in 2004. As a result of increasing the entry fee and expanding the field to 138 teams to include all previous champions, the winning team that year received $50,000.

== Volunteers ==
Each year the Bass Championship attracts close to 500 volunteers.

== Events ==
Events at the FFCBC include daily weigh ins, Daytime Land, and live entertainment. Entertainment consists of live bands, MuchMusic video dance, hypnotists, and local entertainment
