= Emo Speedway =

Coordinates: 48.634447°N 93.835549°W

- Location: Emo, Ontario
- Capacity: 2,000
- Owner: Rainy River Valley Agricultural Society
- Operator: Borderland Racing Association
- Opened: 1954–1959, 1965–1976, 1983–present
- Former names: Emo Raceways
- Major events: Emo Fall Fair (Rea Memorial Weekend), Keith McNally Memorial, Mid-Summer Shootout

Clay Oval
- Length: 0.6 km (0.37 mi)
- Banking: 15 degrees

Emo Speedway is a 3/8, high-banked, dirt oval racetrack located in Emo, Ontario, in Northwestern Ontario, Canada. It is located right inside the town on Colonization Road. Behind the racetrack lies the Rainy River Valley Agricultural Society Fair Grounds. The track is located 30 km west of Fort Frances and 52 km east of Rainy River along the border of Northern Minnesota, US.

The speedway was built in 1954 and hosted its season opener on July 30 of the same year. The original name for the track was Emo Speedway (according to the Fort Frances Times), although the name Emo Raceway(s) was also used.

Currently, Emo Speedway runs three divisions (classes) of cars. They include WISSOTA Modifieds, WISSOTA Midwest Modifieds, and Street Stocks. The season runs from mid-May to mid-September.

The Borderland Racing Association (BRA) is the Promoting Body of Emo Speedway. The BRA is a non-profit organization that operates with the support of volunteers and monetary sponsors.

== The beginning ==
The idea of building a racetrack in the Rainy River District originated in 1949, when Lyle Busch and Bob Oak traveled to Florida to watch the stock car races there. When they brought the idea of a track back to the area, they were unable to find suitable land for it. In 1950, Asselin went to Winnipeg to discuss the building of a track with the owner of Brooklyn Speedway. After long conversations, the owner of the Winnipeg track provided Asselin with his technical information. In May 1954, Sid Asselin and Bob Oak had meetings to organize the construction of the track with the District Fair Board. It was decided in those meetings that it would be built inside the already built horse track, which is approximately 1/2 mile long. With help from the Emo Chamber of Commerce, the track became a reality.

The track was built as a fifth of a mile oval dirt oval. The decision to use clay instead of paved asphalt was due to the softer compound. This allowed the track to be more advantageous for drivers and spectators. There would be a lower chance of serious accidents, and the loose dirt would allow for more skidding, which would enable cars to bump and nudge each other while fighting for position. The track was not banked, but the idea of raising the banking in the future was brought up.

The original organizing body for the Emo Speedway/Raceway was the Borderland Stock Car Racing Company (BSCRC), which Sid Asselin and Bob Oak created.

== History ==
=== 1950s ===
Stock Car Racing opened up at the Emo Speedway on Friday, July 30, 1954. Thirteen competitors showed up for the first night, including drivers such as #8 Sid Asselin, #60 Don Marsh, #100 Maurice Frenette, #5 Lyle Busch, Bill Benniger, #37 Raoul Cayer, Tom Hardy and others. Training had started the Sunday before, and enough cars were ready by the 30th. A lighting system was built (The original blueprints have recently been discovered), and training took place under the lights during the week of the 23rd.

An estimated 2,500 spectators attended the first event (standing room only).

The races were featured for the first time at the Emo Fall Fair on August 14, 1954.

In 1955, the BSCRC was merged with the "International Drivers' Club" (IDC).

The Emo Speedway continued racing until 1959, when diminishing crowds caused the IDC to run out of funds to continue.

It was $1.00 for Adults (Approx. $8 today) and 50 Cents for Kids (Approx. $4 today) for the grandstand entrance.

=== 1960s ===
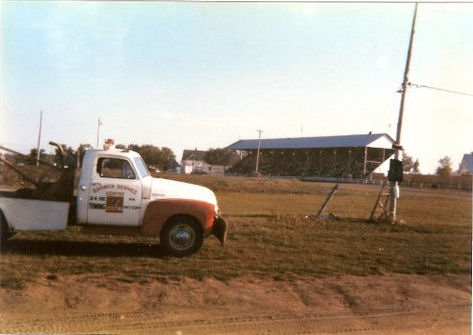
Tow Truck built for Emo Speedway in 1968. This vehicle was one of the first tow trucks to help at the track.

The 1960s represented a golden age in racing. With the help of Glen Jackson, George Oltsher, and others, the interest and support for racing in the Emo community and the surrounding area were at a high during this period. The track had its reopening race in the summer of 1965.

Famous drivers such as #33 George Oltsher, Mel Jack, #1 Larry Jack, #38 Mike Andrusco, #25 Richard Visser, #7 Gary Reid, Gordie Lancaster, and Larry Long raced during this time.

=== 1970s ===
The decade started very well, still riding on the momentum of the great seasons of the 1960s. However, strife between the involved organizing bodies at Emo Raceway became a forefront in politics. People from one group wanted the rules and regulations to be a certain way, and a struggle between who should have control, organizing, etc., occurred.

This led to a shutdown of the racetrack at the end of 1975. Except for a couple of races during the Emo Fall Fair in the mid-70s, the track lay dormant from 1977 to 1982.

Drivers from this period were #6 Gary Wilson, #9 Ken Anderson and others.

=== 1980s ===
In the winter of 1982/1983, a letter to the Editor was written to the Fort Frances Times regarding how much the races were missed during the fair and that the races were the only real event that kept people coming back.

In response to this letter, Tom Jackson replied, saying that if there was enough support to restart the races, he and others had no problem getting cars back on the track.

1983 marked the first year of the track's return to racing. Although it was not until 1986 that full seasons started, a couple of specials, including the Fall Fair, were scheduled. Support was tremendous, and some of the largest crowds ever seen at the track occurred during this time.

The Borderland Racing Association became incorporated in December 1985 and became the overseer of the Emo Speedway. At the end of the 1989 season, the organization decided to join the WISSOTA Promoters' Association with its Modified class (Starting in 1990). This allowed a common set of rules for all tracks in the region, permitting more traveling by local and regional drivers.

Drivers such as #34 Tom Jackson, #8N Brian Nelson, #21 Dwayne Pihulak, #27(#3K)Peter Leek, #14F Greg Ferris, #43 Darren Ward, #12 Dwayne Pelepetz, #2R Ricky Roche and #5 Wes Morriseau started racing during this time.

=== 1990s ===
In Spring 1993, the Emo Grandstand that had stood for ninety-three years was taken down and replaced by an aluminum grandstand with the support of local clubs and organizations including the Borderland Racing Association. The race season was delayed until June due to construction, and a roof was added in 1994.

In September, a tragedy happened when #01 Keith McNally rolled over multiple times in his Thunder Stock on the first lap of the feature. He did not survive his injuries. In remembrance, the Keith McNally Memorial was created to award the Street Stock driver who consistently attends the track, works hard at racing, loves the sport, but unfortunately ends up towards the back. This was awarded to #4 Rick Bourre in 2008.

In 1994, Mini-Sprints were added to the regular schedule. The class had decent numbers for a first-year schedule, with car counts as high as eight on most occasions. The class differed from previous season classes by having a short wheelbase and wings for stability and down force.

In 1995, the Borderland Racing Association (BRA) was acquired by a private promoter named Sonny Ferris. Ferris, who had been the announcer, promoter, and track president for the past few years, decided the track might do better without a Board. Emo Speedway Inc. came into being, abolishing the BRA. However, the decrease in car and fan counts in 1996 and 1997 led to Ferris quitting as private promoter. The Borderland Racing Association returned in 1998 with Ed Rea and others leading the new board of directors.

As quoted in the Fort Frances Times on March 18, 1998:

Ed Rea, who has been a fixture with the Emo Speedway since the mid-1960s, will become the track’s new promoter, taking over from Sonny Ferris, who held that job for the past two seasons. Rea said the track simply could not be maintained under the private ownership of Ferris and instead will now be run as a non-profit organization. "They thought that by switching to a private owner, they could do better, but you just can’t make money [that way], you need free help," Rea stressed yesterday.'

The race dates were also changed from Friday nights to Thursday nights to try to increase car and fan turnout. This, however, didn't work out well, and race nights were subsequently changed in 1999 to Saturday.

The 1990s also saw the introduction of the Super Stock class and the Mini-Sprint class. The Super Stock class never gained traction and remained low in counts from 1995 to 1997, ultimately leading to its decline. The Mini-Sprint class was unstable. The class size fluctuated on a week-to-week basis, but invitationals consistently drew a higher count of around 14 to 16 cars. But the Mini-Sprints fell to an average of only a few in 2004, and the class was dropped before the 2005 season.

Many invitationals were held during the 1990s, particularly between 1995 and 1997. Sonny Ferris hoped the larger payouts would draw in larger crowds and car counts. While car counts were larger due to the higher payouts during special events, fans seemed to become saturated by the sheer number of special events; as a result, regular nights saw a decline in attendance numbers. As a result, large amounts of money were being offered, but little was returned for the track.

The 1990s saw drivers such as #15 Ron Westover, #18 Chris Shine, #16 Gavin Paull, #00 Steve Arpin, #18J Chad Jonson, #2X4 Ken Perry, #11 Anthony Visser, and others start their racing careers during this time.

=== 2000s ===
The success of the late 1990s began to return in 2000 following the reinstatement of the Borderland Racing Association. The beginning of 2000 saw much of the success that had been taken. While low attendance from fans had traditionally occurred during the opening few races, 2000 saw more than average crowds. Although not highly noticeable, it seems that 2000 was a more successful year.

Invitationals were canceled for the 2001 season. This was mainly because more money was being lost than earned, and the latest Modified Invitational that took place on June 30 and July 1, 2000, saw only a few traveling cars, and less than satisfying fan counts. At the end of 2001, new clay was added in the corners of the Speedway.

2001 saw the talented Steve Arpin dominate the WISSOTA Modified class. It was that year that his talents became fully known to the community. During the summer, he won 13 of the 15 races that took place. It was his second championship title in 3 years. His career in the Modifieds took off soon after, and in 2003, Steve raced on a more limited schedule in Emo as well as abroad. His last visit to Emo was during the NOPA Super Truck Special, held on June 18, 2005. Arpin has raced in ARCA, the NASCAR Nationwide Series, and the Camping World Truck Series.

In 2004, a new class was introduced. Midwest Modifieds were created to make a cheaper alternative for open wheel racing, such as the Modifieds. This allowed the older motors and chassis that were used on Modifieds during the 1990s to be raced again. During the year, the Borderland Racing Association ran Street Stocks, Modifieds, Midwest Modifieds, and Mini-Sprints.

In 2004, a new lighting system was also installed for the racetrack. A dozen or so Mercury-vapour lights replaced the older halogen lights which had been in place since the early 1980s. It also featured underground wiring that required fewer poles, which in turn, allowed an increase in fan viewing ability. A new pit canteen was also built in that year.

2005 was a down-and-up season. Firstly, the season got off to a rough start as the opener was canceled due to rain and the first two weeks of June were also rained out. The weekend of June 17 brought the first real sunshine and blue skies. The first invitational to be scheduled since 2000 took place on June 18. NOPA Super Trucks from Winnipeg, Manitoba, visited Emo Speedway for the first time. Seven trucks made the long trip, and a higher than usual turnout was seen in the grandstand and the rest of the season turned out very well in terms of weather, except for Friday night of the Fall Fair, when two inches of rain two days before and rain all day race day made for a mess.

2006 started much better than 2005 as the season opener on May 20 took place as scheduled. The BRA decided to include rain dates set for 1:00 pm on Sunday if the races were canceled on a Saturday night. The season only saw one rain date used, which was on Sunday, August 13. In 2006, the series also saw the return of Super Stocks to Emo Speedway after almost a decade. The Special took place on July 22, 2006, with 15 cars traveling from Thunder Bay, Ontario, Winnipeg, Manitoba, Bemidji, Minnesota, and Ashland, Wisconsin. The winner was Gary Nelson Jr. out of Blackduck, MN.

The 2007 season began on May 19, with cloudy skies and a temperature of 10°C (50°F). An average crowd for an opener braved the cold temperatures to watch the action. 2007 was a wet season followed by a dry season. One week after cold temperatures, a full day of rain the following Saturday canceled the races. The following week, the Modified feature was rained out. June 9 was also a complete rainout. June 16 had beautiful weather, the first of the year, but the weekend after saw the features rained out. Canada Day Celebrations on June 30 had a double whammy. The features from June 23 ran plus a full show!

The second half of the season had only one rainout (July 14), but from then on, it was great. The 2007 Super Stock Special saw 15 cars compete once again. The bonus was that they were also competing in the first year of the Northern Super Stock Touring Series, with Emo being the second of the three-race series. The winner was #20 Kevin Penner of Blumenort, Manitoba, Canada.

2008 was a wet start. Although the track would run its first four races of the season, there was no racing for three weeks out of four in June. On July 19, the Northern Super Stock Touring Series was rained out halfway after a record total of 16 WISSOTA Super Stocks had arrived. The race was rescheduled for August 2, where only 7 cars returned. However, the Annual Fall Fair Specials had beautiful weather. However, on August 23 and September 6, the races were cut short and subsequently canceled.

In late September 2008, 300 dump truck loads (3,500 yards) of clay were added to the track. A complete resurfacing of the track was done.

In 2009, the Emo Speedway celebrated its 55th anniversary of the original track opening on July 25. A large crowd and over 125 past and present drivers attended the event. The winners were Greg Ferris in the WISSOTA Modifieds, Brady Caul in the WISSOTA Midwest Modifieds, and Scott Messner in the Street Stocks.
