= Fort Frances Times =

Canadian newspaper

- Type: Weekly newspaper
- Headquarters: 116 First Street East Fort Frances, ON P9A 1K2
- Website: https://fftimes.com/

The Fort Frances Times is an independently owned weekly publication based in Fort Frances, Ontario, Canada, published each Wednesday. A supplemental issue called the Bulletin of the Fort Frances Times ("The Daily Bulletin") is released on Tuesday & Thursday. It is a member of the Ontario Community Newspapers Association (OCNA) and the Canadian Community Newspapers Association (CCNA). The Fort Frances Times has captured the stories and the history of the town of Fort Frances and the Rainy River District for over 127 years, one of the longest-running businesses in the region, since 1896. Locally owned for almost its entire existence, the Times was purchased from the Cumming family in 2019 by London Publishing, but continues to be a community-based newspaper and publishing company. The weekly circulation as of June 2022 was 2,840.

== See also ==
- List of newspapers in Canada
