= Atikokan Roman Catholic Separate School Board =

School board in Ontario, Canada

The Atikokan Roman Catholic Separate School Board was a school authority in the Canadian province of Ontario. It was the school district administrator for Roman Catholic schools in Atikokan, Ontario, with approximately 150 students.

The Board was amalgamated into the Northwest Catholic District School Board as of September 1, 2009.
