= Fort Frances High School =

Location
- 440 McIrvine Rd; Fort Frances, Ontario, P9A 3T8; Canada; 48.6091°N 93.4243°W

Information
- School type: High school
- Motto: Palma Non Sine Pulvere (No Reward without Effort)
- School board: Rainy River District School Board
- Principal: Brad Gascoigne
- Grades: 7 - 12
- Language: English; French immersion
- Colour
- Team name: Fort Frances Muskies
- Website: muskie.rrdsb.com

Fort Frances High School is the only high school serving Fort Frances, Ontario. The school is administered by the Rainy River District School Board and serves roughly 475 students.

== History ==
The original Fort Frances High School was located in downtown Fort Frances in what is now the Fort Frances Museum. A much larger high school was built on Second Street E. For a time, Fort Frances had two high schools: one for students in grade 9 (Westfort High) and the other for students in grades 10-13 (Fort Frances High School). The high school on Second Street was closed in 1999, with all students moving to a renovated Westfort High, then renamed to Fort Frances High School. The old high school has since been renovated and turned into local heath services and businesses.

In 2016, Fort Frances High School was opened to students in grades 7-8, known as "Fort Frances High School Intermediates." The students were moved from the adjacent elementary schools, JW Walker and Robert Moore, to alleviate overcrowding there and to boost attendance at FFHS.

== Sport achievements ==
List of Fort Frances High School NorWOSSA championships:

Sport	NorWOSSA Championships	
Senior Boys Volleyball	1985, 1995, 1997, 1998, 1999	
Senior Girls Volleyball	1969, 1973, 1994, 1997, 2000, 2001	
Junior Boys Volleyball	1990, 1993, 1996, 1998, 2002, 2010, 2016, 2017, 2018	
Junior Girls Volleyball	1991, 1993, 1994, 1996, 1997, 1998, 1999, 2001, 2002, 2003, 2012, 2015	
Senior Boys Basketball	1967, 1968, 1973, 1974, 1977, 1978, 2000, 2001, 2002, 2004, 2007, 2008, 2009, 2010, 2011, 2012	
Junior Boys Basketball	1997, 1998, 2007, 2008, 2009, 2010, 2012, 2014, 2016	2012 NWOSSA Champions
Senior Girls Basketball	1978, 1979, 1982, 2000, 2003, 2004, 2009, 2012, 2013, 2014	
Junior Girls Basketball	1980, 1988, 1999, 2002, 2005, 2007, 2009, 2010, 2011, 2012, 2013	
Girls Hockey	2014, 2015	2015 OFSAA Silver
Boys Hockey	1969, 1971, 1972, 1973, 1975, 1976, 1977, 1981, 1984, 1985, 1986, 1987, 1988, 1989, 1993, 1994, 1995, 1996, 1999, 2000, 2001, 2004, 2005, 2007, 2008, 2009, 2010, 2011, 2012, 2014, 2015, 2016, 2017	1986, 1989, 2001, 2016 OFSAA Gold Ontario Champions
Girls Soccer	1989, 1990, 1991, 1992, 1995, 1998, 1999, 2000, 2001, 2002, 2004, 2008, 2014	
Boys Soccer	1989, 1990, 1996, 1998, 2002, 2004, 2006, 2013, 2014	

Boys Curling 2011: NorWossa Champions, NWOSAA Champions & OFSAA Silver Medalists. Team consisted of Skip: Isaac Keffer / Third: Cody Heyens / Second: Ian Grant / Lead: Jordan Sokoliuk & Alternate: Luke Esselink

Football Team: 2019 WHSFL DIV 3 championship, 2021 NORWASSA championship, 2023 WHSFL DIV 3 championship

== See also ==
- Education in Ontario
- List of secondary schools in Ontario
