= NASCAR O'Reilly Auto Parts Series at Gateway Motorsports Park =

Stock car races in Madison, Illinois, USA

Nu Way 225 Powered by Bobcat and Sauced by Blues Hog

NASCAR O'Reilly Auto Parts Series
- Venue: World Wide Technology Raceway
- Location: Madison, Illinois, United States
- Corporate sponsor: Title Sponsor: Nu Way; Presenting Sponsors: Bobcat; Blues Hog
- First race: 1997
- Distance: 225 miles (362.102 km)
- Laps: 180; Stages 1/2: 45 each Final stage: 90
- Previous names: Gateway 300 (1997); Carquest Auto Parts 250 (1998–2001); Charter Pipeline 250 (2002–2003); Charter 250 (2004); Wallace Family Tribute 250 (2005); Busch Silver Celebration 250 (2006); Gateway 250 (2007); Missouri-Illinois Dodge Dealers 250 (2008–2010); 5-Hour Energy 250 (2010 II); Nu Way 200 (2025)
- Most wins (driver): Carl Edwards (3)
- Most wins (team): Roush Fenway Racing (4)
- Most wins (manufacturer): Chevrolet (8)

Circuit information
- Surface: Asphalt
- Length: 1.250 mi (2.012 km)
- Turns: 4

The Nu Way 225 (currently known for sponsorship reasons as the Nu Way 225 Powered by Bobcat and Sauced by Blues Hog) is a NASCAR O'Reilly Auto Parts Series race at World Wide Technology Raceway in Madison, Illinois.

Jesse Love is the defending winner, having won the event in 2026.

== History ==
First added to the schedule in 1997, the race was held at 300 miles (482.803 km) and would be won by Elliott Sadler. The race was then held at 250 miles (402.336 km) miles from 1998–2010.

2010 saw the track receiving a second race, (also a 250 miles race) when the race at Memphis was removed. The track was dropped from the-then Nationwide Series calendar for 2011.

It was announced on August 29, 2024, that Gateway would host an Xfinity Series event. On August 14, 2025, it was announced that the race would be a 200 miles (321.869 km) race titled the Nu Way 200 Sauced by Blues Hog. On January 22, 2026, it was announced that the race had been extended to 225 miles (362.102 km). That same year, it was announced that Bobcat would join Blues Hog as a presenting sponsor for the race to be titled the Nu Way 225 Powered by Bobcat and Sauced by Blues Hog.

== Past winners ==
Year	Date	Driver	Team	Manufacturer	Race Distance		Race Time	Average Speed (mph)	Report	Ref
Year	Date	Driver	Team	Manufacturer	Laps	Miles (km)	Race Time	Average Speed (mph)	Report	Ref
1997	July 26	Elliott Sadler	Diamond Ridge Motorsports	Chevrolet	240	300 (482.803)	3:48:25	78.803	Report	
1998	October 17	Dale Earnhardt Jr.	Dale Earnhardt, Inc.	Chevrolet	200	250 (402.336)	2:23:27	104.566	Report	
1999	July 31	Dale Earnhardt Jr.	Dale Earnhardt, Inc.	Chevrolet	200	250 (402.336)	2:23:55	104.227	Report	
2000	July 29	Kevin Harvick	Richard Childress Racing	Chevrolet	200	250 (402.336)	2:08:39	116.595	Report	
2001	July 21	Kevin Harvick	Richard Childress Racing	Chevrolet	200	250 (402.336)	2:25:00	103.448	Report	
2002	July 20	Greg Biffle	Roush Racing	Ford	200	250 (402.336)	2:20:17	106.926	Report	
2003	May 10	Scott Riggs	ppc Racing	Ford	200	250 (402.336)	2:41:31	92.87	Report	
2004	May 8	Martin Truex Jr.	Chance 2 Motorsports	Chevrolet	200	250 (402.336)	2:27:50	101.466	Report	
2005	July 30	Reed Sorenson	Chip Ganassi Racing	Dodge	200	250 (402.336)	2:25:11	103.318	Report	
2006	July 29	Carl Edwards	Roush Racing	Ford	200	250 (402.336)	2:05:54	119.142	Report	
2007	July 21	Reed Sorenson	Chip Ganassi Racing	Dodge	200	250 (402.336)	2:37:56	94.977	Report	
2008	July 19	Carl Edwards	Roush Fenway Racing	Ford	200	250 (402.336)	2:18:46	108.095	Report	
2009	July 18	Kyle Busch	Joe Gibbs Racing	Toyota	200	250 (402.336)	2:25:14	103.286	Report	
2010	July 17	Carl Edwards	Roush Fenway Racing	Ford	200	250 (402.336)	2:27:22	101.787	Report	
2010	October 23	Brad Keselowski	Penske Racing	Dodge	200	250 (402.336)	2:20:21	106.876	Report	
2011 – 2024	Not held									
2025	September 6	Connor Zilisch	JR Motorsports	Chevrolet	160	200 (321.868)	2:12:32	90.543	Report	
2026	September 12	Jesse Love	Richard Childress Racing	Chevrolet	180	225 (363.102)	2:25:13	92.965	Report	
2027	August 21								Report	

=== Multiple winners (drivers) ===
# Wins	Driver	Years won
3	Carl Edwards	2006, 2008, 2010
2	Dale Earnhardt Jr.	1998-1999
2	Kevin Harvick	2000-2001
2	Reed Sorenson	2005, 2007

=== Multiple winners (teams) ===
# Wins	Team	Years won
4	Roush Fenway Racing	2002, 2006, 2008, 2010
3	Richard Childress Racing	2000-2001, 2026
2	Dale Earnhardt Inc.	1998-1999
2	Chip Ganassi Racing	2005, 2007

=== Manufacturer wins ===
# Wins	Make	Years won
8	(United States) Chevrolet	1997-2001, 2004, 2025-2026
5	(United States) Ford	2002-2003, 2006, 2008, 2010
2	(United States) Dodge	2005, 2007, 2010 II

Previous race: Food City 300	NASCAR O'Reilly Auto Parts Series; Nu Way 225	Next race: Winn-Dixie 250
