= Cedar Lake Speedway =

Race track in New Richmond, Wisconsin

"Wisconsin's Fastest Piece Of Real Estate"
- Location: New Richmond, Wisconsin
- Coordinates: 45.19031°N 92.588°W
- Capacity: 10,000+
- Owner: Robert Kaufman, Brad Both, Chuck Kaufman, Chris Heinbuch
- Broke ground: 1956
- Opened: 1957
- Major events: The Masters, USA Nationals

Oval
- Surface: Clay
- Length: 0.375 mi (0.604 km)
- Turns: 4

Cedar Lake Speedway is a 3/8 mile dirt clay oval race track located near New Richmond / Somerset, Wisconsin. Named after the nearby Cedar Lake, it hosts a weekly NASCAR racing program consisting of Late Models, Modifieds, Super Stocks, and Midwest Modifieds. It also hosts multi day events such as "The Masters," "The USA Nationals," "The Legendary 100," and the "Triple Crown." There is an Indoor Motocross facility and 1/5 mile dirt oval, Cedar Lake Arena, located directly behind the track.

== History ==
Elmer Cook, his wife Lorraine, and their family owned a 160-acre (0.65 km^{2}) farm located near New Richmond, Wisconsin. Elmer had tried several professions before starting the speedway. Elmer attempted farming, tavern keeping, truck driving, and construction.

In August 1956 Elmer had a crew but work was not fast. He decided to build a new driveway across the swamp on his farm property to get out to County Road CC which was called Swede Road then. Although it was not known at the time construction began, the driveway would later become the main entrance to the racetrack. With the driveway completed, Elmer and his oldest son Bob were resting on the lawn after lunch admiring how the back slope was built up so high. Elmer remarked how the natural bowl around the swamp would make a perfect racetrack. Soon Elmer and Bob began talking about auto racing. Elmer had actually only been to a couple races in his life, but his family did enjoy the sport of auto racing. Then Elmer asked Bob what he thought about the idea of building a racetrack in the swamp. Bob jumped at the idea and plans were quickly underway. Bob asked when he could start building the track. Elmer figured they did not have a lot of work for the Caterpillar grader right at the moment, so he told Bob, who was only 14 at the time that he could start tomorrow morning. At 6:00 am the next morning, after a restless night Bob was on the cat and the first construction of a dirt race track begin. The outline of the track quickly took shape, and it was roughed out in approximately three weeks. The track's first event had 85 spectators watch 12 cars compete.

In 2001, Brad Both and three Kaufman brothers joined the ownership group of the track to complement the Cook family. Cedar Lake Speedway signed with NASCAR as a NASCAR Home Track in 2008. At the annual school bus race of the 2020 season, a track worker died while trying to remove an overturned vehicle from the track.

== NASCAR Night ==
Several NASCAR Sprint Cup Series and several Nationwide Series drivers have visited the legendary Cedar Lake Speedway on the annual NASCAR Night at the races. Many of the drivers have raced in their own or in borrowed cars including Kenny Wallace, Tony Stewart, Travis Kvapil, Greg Biffle, Sterling Marlin and Paul Menard.

Dale Earnhardt Jr. visited Cedar Lake Speedway in 2007 but did not race, due to his DEI contract. No one visited in 2009, due to scheduling conflicts.

== Major events ==
Cedar Lake Speedway host several major events including

- USMTS Modified Nationals; the event paid $50,000 to win in 2017.
- World of Outlaws USA Nationals
- World of Outlaws Late Model Series - event paid $20,000 to win in 2020
- Legendary 100
- Triple Crown with the NASCAR late models and IRA Sprint Cars
