= Kenora 38B =

Rat Portage 38B
- Indian reserve
- Rat Portage Reserve No. 38B
- Location within Ontario
- Coordinates: 49°44′N 94°26′W
- Country: Canada
- Province: Ontario
- District: Kenora
- First Nation: Anishinabe of Wauzhushk Onigum

Area
  - Land: 18.88 km^{2} (7.29 sq mi)

Population (2011)
  - Total: 394
  - Density: 20.9/km^{2} (54/sq mi)

Rat Portage 38B is a First Nations reserve on Lake of the Woods in Kenora District, Ontario. It is one of the reserves of the Anishinabe of Wauzhushk Onigum.
