= Northwest Catholic District School Board =

School board in Ontario, Canada

Northwest Catholic District School Board TNCDSB

Location
- 555 Flinders Ave; Fort Frances, ON; P9A 3L2 Sioux Lookout, Dryden, Atikokan, Fort Frances, Stratton Canada
- Coordinates: 48.6106°N 93.4223°W

District information
- Chair of the board: Kathy Bryck
- Director of education: Jackie Robinson
- Schools: 5 elementary
- District ID: B29041

Other information
- Elected trustees: 9
- Website: www.tncdsb.on.ca

The Northwest Catholic District School Board (TNCDSB, known as English-language Separate District School Board No. 33A prior to 1999) is a separate school board in Ontario serving the Rainy River District and portions of the Kenora District.

== Schools and Offices ==
TNCDSB operate corporate offices in Fort Frances and business offices in Dryden.

The five elementary schools operated by TNCDSB are: Our Lady of the Way School in Morley; Sacred Heart School in Sioux Lookout; St. Joseph's School in Dryden; St. Patrick's School in Atikokan; and St. Mary School in Fort Frances.

TNCDSB does not operate any secondary schools.

== Expansion ==
TNCDSB amalgamated the Atikokan Roman Catholic Separate School Board as of September 1, 2009.

== See also ==
- List of school districts in Ontario
- List of high schools in Ontario
