= Fort Frances =

- Town (single-tier)
- Town of Fort Frances
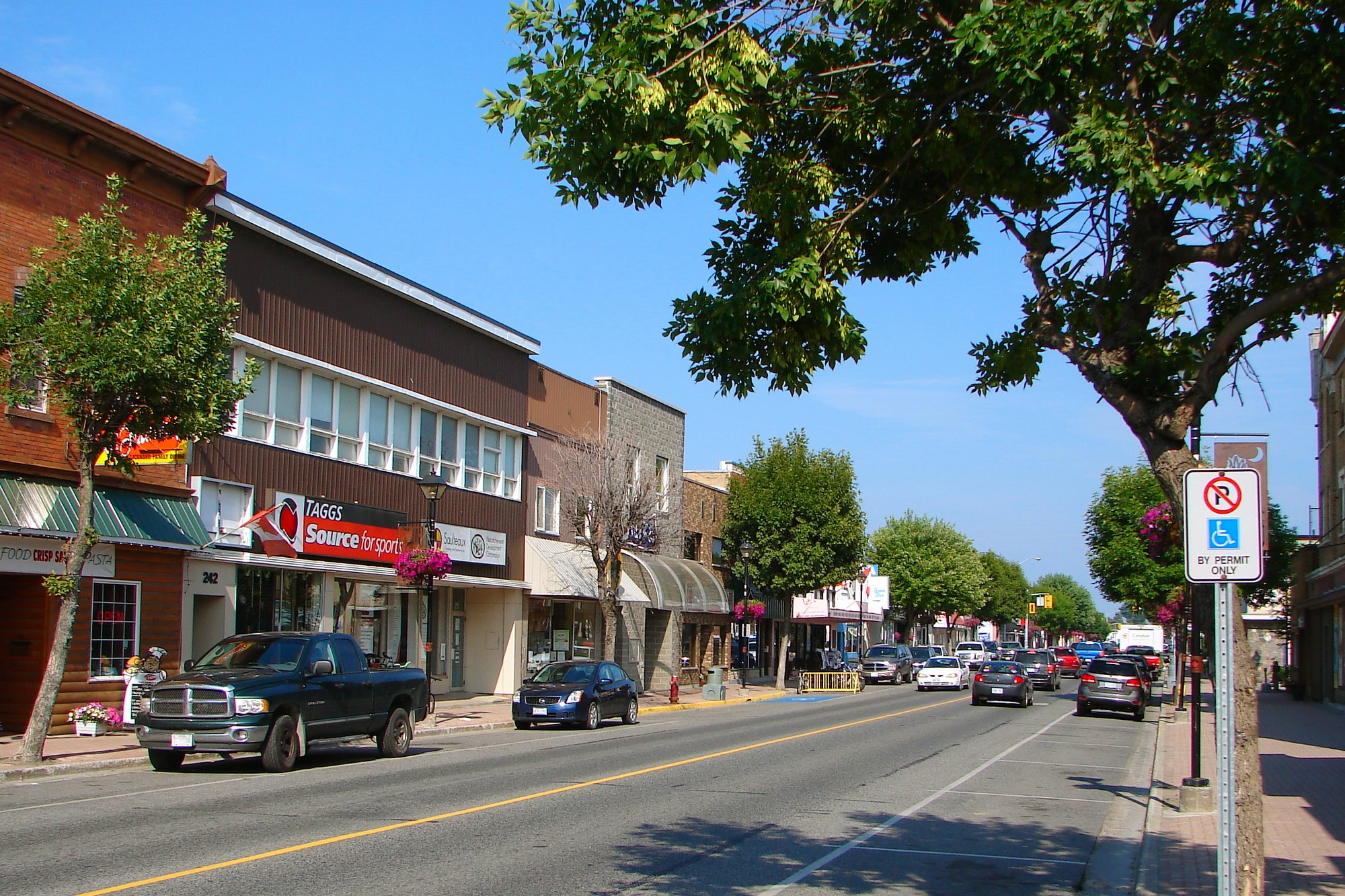

- Coat of arms
- Nickname: Fort
- Motto(s): Industry and perseverance
- Location within Ontario
- Coordinates: 48°36′36″N 93°23′55″W
- Country: Canada
- Province: Ontario
- District: Rainy River
- Incorporated: 1903

Government
  - Mayor: Brent Calder
  - Fed. riding: Thunder Bay—Rainy River
  - Prov. riding: Kenora—Rainy River

Area
  - Land: 25.55 km^{2} (9.86 sq mi)
  - Urban: 7.29 km^{2} (2.81 sq mi)

Population (2021)
  - Total: 7,466
  - Density: 292.2/km^{2} (757/sq mi)
  - Urban: 7,159
  - Urban density: 982.2/km^{2} (2,544/sq mi)
- Demonym: Fort Francians
- Time zone: UTC−6 (CST)
  - Summer (DST): UTC−5 (CDT)
- Forward sortation area: P9A
- Area code: 807
- Website: fortfrances.ca

Fort Frances is a town in, and the seat of, Rainy River District in Northwestern Ontario, Canada. The population as of the 2021 census was 7,466. Fort Frances is a popular fishing destination. It hosts the annual Fort Frances Canadian Bass Championship.

Located on the international border with the United States where Rainy Lake narrows to become Rainy River, it is connected to International Falls, Minnesota by the Fort Frances–International Falls International Bridge. The town is the fourth-largest community in Northwestern Ontario after Thunder Bay, Kenora, and Dryden.

== History ==
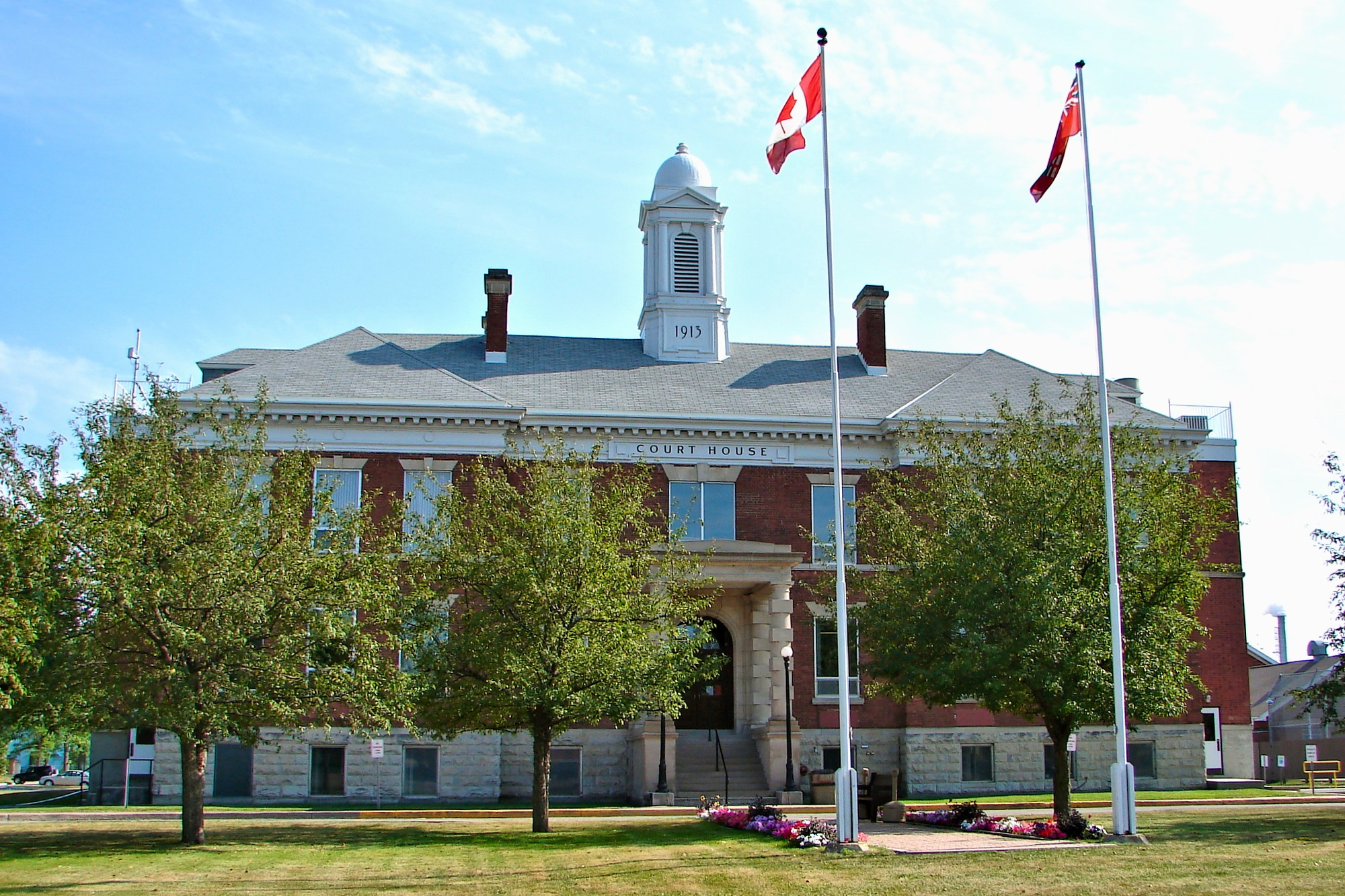
Fort Frances courthouse

From the latter part of the 17th century, the outlet of Rainy Lake was an important site for the North American fur trade, because it provided a vital link from Lake Superior to the west. In 1688, the first French post was established there.

Fort Frances was the first European settlement west of Lake Superior and was established by French Canadian Pierre Gaultier de Varennes, sieur de La Vérendrye, first commander of the western district. In 1731, he built Fort Saint Pierre near that spot as support for the fur trade with native peoples. In 1732, his expedition built Fort Saint Charles on Magnuson's Island on the west side of Lake of the Woods. After some time, Fort Saint Pierre fell out of use.

In 1818, following the War of 1812 and the redefinition of borders between Canada and the United States, the Hudson's Bay Company (HBC) built a fort here, originally called Lac la Pluie House. In 1822, the post became the headquarters for the Lac la Pluie District, created that same year, and attracted a growing population of European settlers. In 1830, HBC Chief Factor John Dugald Cameron renamed the fur trading post after Frances Ramsay Simpson, the 18-year-old daughter of a London merchant, who had married earlier that year in London, George Simpson, Governor of the Hudson's Bay Company, who would visit the fort many times. In 1841 she became Lady Simpson after George Simpson was knighted, and she died in 1853 at Lachine, Quebec.

In 1857 to 1858, the Dawson Trail was surveyed, connecting Fort Frances to Fort William to the east and the Red River Colony to the west, and making the town a supply depot for travelers. In the mid-1880s, the railroad to Kenora was completed.

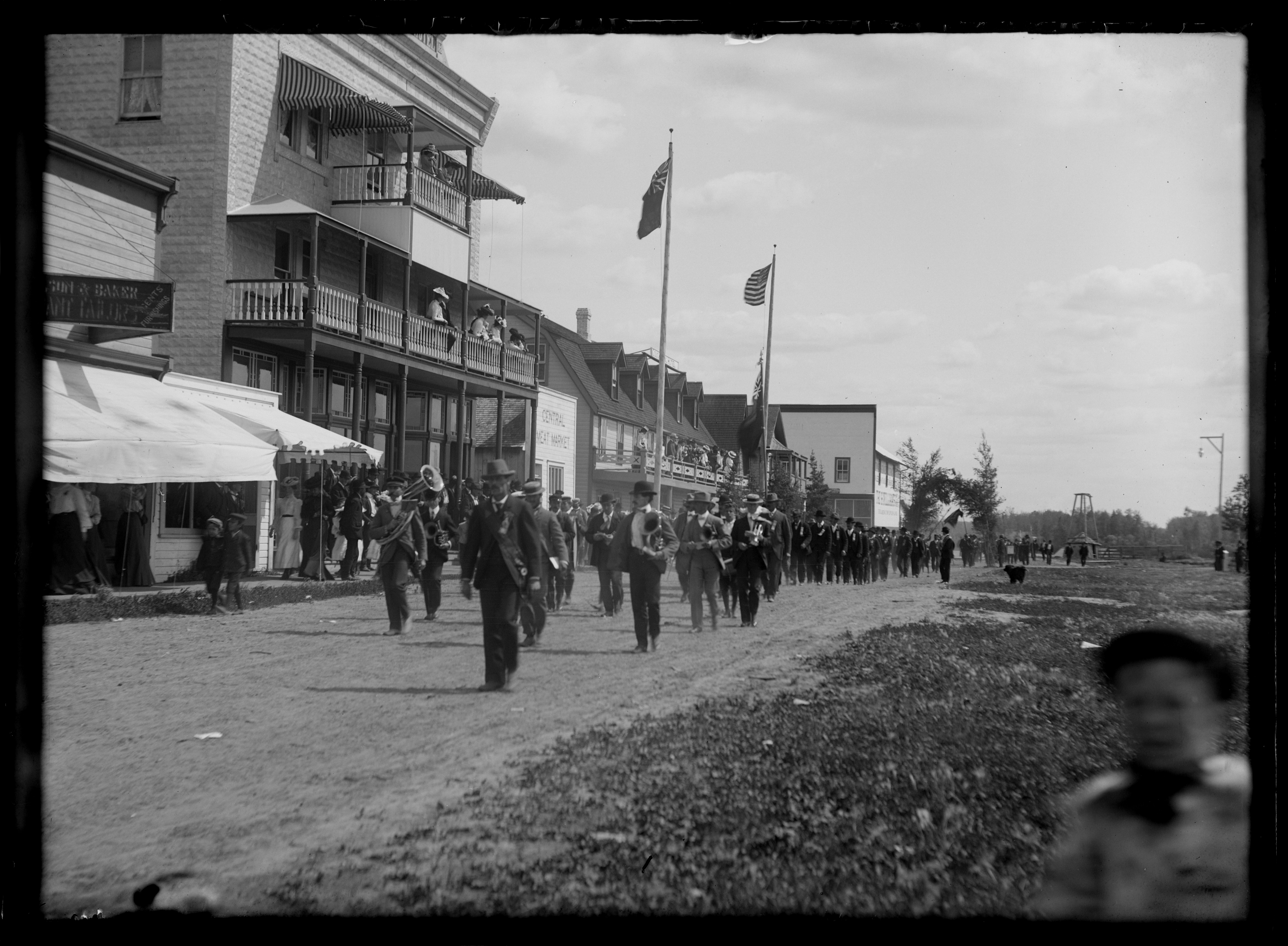
July 1st parade, Fort Frances, ca. 1905

Fort Frances was incorporated in 1903. That same year, the HBC store burned down and was not rebuilt.

The main employer was a pulp and paper mill established in the early 1900s. It had numerous owners over the years, notably Edward Wellington Backus. Most recently owned by Resolute Forest Products, the mill employed about 700 persons until its closure in 2014.

On June 25, 1946, the town was struck by a tornado, which caused major damage and struck a week after the deadly Windsor tornado.

On August 25, 2013, the town hosted the final pitstop in the Kraft Celebration Tour by receiving the most votes out of all 20 communities

On January 14, 2014, Resolute Forest Products announced that it planned to stop operations of the final paper machine and close out its operations in Fort Frances by the end of the month.

On December 13, 2014, Tim Hortons filmed a commercial in Fort Frances. The commercial, which dubs Fort Frances "one of the coldest places in Canada", was shot at the local Tim Hortons. In the days leading up to the filming, yarn was seen covering trees, benches, etc. Workers had spent the night covering the interior of the restaurant with yarn and building a giant toque on the roof. For the day, the coffee was free.

In August 2015 the Seven Generations Education Institute hosted the World Indigenous Nations Higher Education Consortium's (WINHEC) Annual General Meeting at the Nanicost Grounds for members attending from all over the world.

== Geography ==
=== Climate ===
Fort Frances experiences a humid continental climate (Köppen climate classification Dfb), with cold winters and warm summers. Temperatures beyond 34 °C (93.2 °F) have been measured in all five late-spring and summer months. Summer highs are comparable to Paris and the Los Angeles Basin coastline in California, whereas winter lows on average resemble southern Siberia and polar subarctic inland Scandinavia.

Fort Frances, along with Atikokan hold the record for the highest temperature ever recorded in the province of Ontario. On 13 July 1936 the mercury climbed to 42.2 °C (108.0 °F).

Climate data for Fort Frances Municipal Airport, 1991−2020 normals, extremes 1892−present (Note: Temperature and precipitation normals were collected at Fort Frances Airport for the period 1981−2010. Extreme high and low temperatures were recorded in the town of Fort Frances from January 1892 to September 1995 and at Fort Frances Airport from August 1976 to present.)
Month	Jan	Feb	Mar	Apr	May	Jun	Jul	Aug	Sep	Oct	Nov	Dec	Year
Record high °C (°F)	10.0 (50.0)	13.2 (55.8)	26.4 (79.5)	31.7 (89.1)	35.0 (95.0)	40.0 (104.0)	42.2 (108.0)	35.6 (96.1)	35.6 (96.1)	31.1 (88.0)	22.8 (73.0)	13.9 (57.0)	42.2 (108.0)
Mean daily maximum °C (°F)	−9.3 (15.3)	−5.9 (21.4)	1.7 (35.1)	9.9 (49.8)	17.6 (63.7)	22.7 (72.9)	25.2 (77.4)	24.2 (75.6)	18.9 (66.0)	10.4 (50.7)	1.1 (34.0)	−6.3 (20.7)	9.2 (48.6)
Daily mean °C (°F)	−15.2 (4.6)	−12.5 (9.5)	−4.6 (23.7)	3.6 (38.5)	10.8 (51.4)	16.3 (61.3)	18.7 (65.7)	17.6 (63.7)	12.7 (54.9)	5.3 (41.5)	−3.2 (26.2)	−11.2 (11.8)	3.2 (37.8)
Mean daily minimum °C (°F)	−21.0 (−5.8)	−19.1 (−2.4)	−11.0 (12.2)	−2.9 (26.8)	4.0 (39.2)	9.8 (49.6)	12.1 (53.8)	10.9 (51.6)	6.5 (43.7)	0.3 (32.5)	−7.3 (18.9)	−16.0 (3.2)	−2.8 (27.0)
Record low °C (°F)	−45.0 (−49.0)	−45.5 (−49.9)	−37.3 (−35.1)	−28.5 (−19.3)	−11.1 (12.0)	−5.0 (23.0)	0.6 (33.1)	−4.0 (24.8)	−7.8 (18.0)	−16.7 (1.9)	−38.0 (−36.4)	−42.0 (−43.6)	−45.5 (−49.9)
Average precipitation mm (inches)	31.7 (1.25)	20.8 (0.82)	32.4 (1.28)	45.2 (1.78)	85.8 (3.38)	109.2 (4.30)	102.1 (4.02)	85.2 (3.35)	84.2 (3.31)	58.5 (2.30)	43.3 (1.70)	32.7 (1.29)	731.0 (28.78)
Average rainfall mm (inches)	0.0 (0.0)	2.4 (0.09)	11.7 (0.46)	34.9 (1.37)	85.3 (3.36)	114.3 (4.50)	104.0 (4.09)	86.6 (3.41)	85.9 (3.38)	54.2 (2.13)	22.4 (0.88)	2.9 (0.11)	604.4 (23.80)
Average snowfall cm (inches)	38.4 (15.1)	20.9 (8.2)	18.8 (7.4)	12.1 (4.8)	0.3 (0.1)	0.0 (0.0)	0.0 (0.0)	0.0 (0.0)	0.0 (0.0)	3.9 (1.5)	30.7 (12.1)	31.9 (12.6)	157.0 (61.8)
Average precipitation days (≥ 0.2 mm)	10.6	8.8	9.2	9.6	14.8	15.6	14.6	11.9	14.0	12.7	9.9	11.1	142.8
Average rainy days (≥ 0.2 mm)	0.0	0.63	1.7	6.4	13.2	13.1	13.3	11.0	12.7	10.1	2.9	0.56	85.5
Average snowy days (≥ 0.2 cm)	8.8	6.1	4.6	2.3	0.11	0.0	0.0	0.0	0.0	1.8	6.5	7.7	37.8
Source: Environment Canada

== Demographics ==
In the 2021 Census of Population conducted by Statistics Canada, Fort Frances had a population of 7,466 living in 3,451 of its 3,779 total private dwellings, a change of −3.5% from its 2016 population of 7,739. With a land area of 25.55 km^{2} (9.86 sq mi), it had a population density of 292.2/km^{2} (756.8/sq mi) in 2021.

Fort Frances had a population of 7,739 people in 2016, which represents a decrease of 2.7% from the 2011 census count. The median household income in 2015 for Fort Frances was $62,928, which was below the Ontario provincial average of $74,287.

In 2021, Statistics Canada reported that the age demographic broke down as follows for Fort Frances:

- Under 14 — 14.9%
- 15 to 24 — 11.2%
- 25 to 34 — 12.1%
- 35 to 44 — 10.4%
- 45 to 54 — 12.0%
- 55 to 64 — 16.0%
- Over 65 — 23.4%

Historical census populations – Fort Frances

Year	Pop.	±%
1901	697	—
1911	1,611	+131.1%
1921	3,109	+93.0%
1931	5,470	+75.9%
1941	5,897	+7.8%
1951	8,038	+36.3%
1956	9,005	+12.0%

Year	Pop.	±%
1961	9,481	+5.3%
1966	9,524	+0.5%
1971	9,947	+4.4%
1976	9,325	−6.3%
1981	8,906	−4.5%
1986	8,870	−0.4%
1991	8,891	+0.2%

Year	Pop.	±%
1996	8,790	−1.1%
2001	8,315	−5.4%
2006	8,103	−2.5%
2011	7,952	−1.9%
2016	7,739	−2.7%
2021	7,466	−3.5%

Source: Statistics Canada

== Economy ==
The Fort Frances Paper Mill was formerly the main employer and industry in the town until its closure in January 2014. Today, there is no manufacturing or major industry in Fort Frances. Healthcare, social services and the town corporation make up the majority of the top tier employers, with big box retail coming in second. New Gold, a Canadian mining company, acquired mineral rights to the area in 2013. The Rainy River mine commenced processing ore on September 14, 2017 and completed its first gold pour on October 5, 2017.

== Culture and attractions ==
- The Fort Frances Museum
- Fort Frances Library and Technology Centre
- The Border Land Arts Alliance
- Tour de Fort
- Point Park
- LaVerendrye Parkway- The Sorting Gap Marina
- The Lookout Tower, open to tour during summer
- The Tugboat Hallet, open to tour during summer
- Fort Frances Canadian Bass Championship, held annually in late July
- Scott Street Shopping District
- Kitchen Creek Golf Club
- Heron Landing Golf Course
- 8th Street Walking & Ski Trails
- Little Beaver Snow Park
- Rainy Lake Square
- Town Hall
- Rendezvous Yacht Club
- The Noden Causeway
- The Rainy Lake Nordic Ski Club

== Sport ==
Fort Frances is home to the following amateur sports teams:

- Fort Frances Lakers (Junior ice hockey)
- Fort Frances Thunderhawks (Senior ice hockey)

Fort Frances was the home of the former amateur sports teams:

- Fort Frances Borderland Thunder (Junior ice hockey)
- Fort Frances Canadians (Senior ice hockey)
- Fort Frances Royals (Junior ice hockey)

Sporting facilities include :

- Memorial Sports Centre
- Couchiching First Nations Arena also known as "The Duke" – located in neighboring Couchiching First Nation
- Fort Frances Curling Club (Curl Fort Frances Community Centre)

== Coat of arms ==
The city coat of arms features a bull moose; maple leaves; a "Magneto", representative of electricity (industry); two men in a canoe; a white pine tree; and the motto "Industry and Perseverance."

== Transportation ==
There are three airports in the area, one of which is in the United States. The two city airports are for general aviation and the other is a privately owned floatplane base.

- Fort Frances Municipal Airport
- Fort Frances Water Aerodrome
- Falls International Airport

Fort Frances Municipal Airport does not have regularly scheduled commercial airline service. It was previously served by only one company, Bearskin Airlines, with flights to and from Kenora, Winnipeg, Thunder Bay, and Dryden. Falls International Airport has flights to Minneapolis–Saint Paul by Delta Connection.

Ontario Highway 11 and Ontario Highway 71, the latter of which ends in Fort Frances, are the two major highways in the community. Both are part of the Trans-Canada Highway. The town is connected to Kenora via Highway 71, while Highway 11 provides connections to Devlin, Emo, and Rainy River to the west, and Atikokan and Thunder Bay to the east.

Canadian National Railway travels into Fort Frances with freight traffic only and travels across the Fort Frances-International Falls International Bridge, over the Rainy River, into the US.

Train, truck and car traffic to and from the United States traverses the International Bridge.

Fort Frances Transit operated until 1996, and Fort Frances Handi-Van Transit is a provincially-funded service run by the Town of Fort Frances. Caribou Coach Transportation Company Incorporated cancelled its bus route to and from Thunder Bay in October 2017. The route was once served by Greyhound Canada. North Air operates a taxi service from Fort Frances whose service area includes the International Falls, Minnesota area and airport.

== Education ==
=== Elementary and secondary schools ===
Rainy River District School Board

- Fort Frances High School
- Robert Moore School
- J.W. Walker School

Northwest Catholic District School Board

- St Mary's School

=== Post-secondary schools ===
- Confederation College
- Seven Generations Education Institute

=== Former elementary schools ===
Rainy River District School Board

- Fort Kinhaven School
- F.H. Huffman School
- Alexander Mackenzie School
- Sixth Street School
- Alberton Central School (Alberton, Ontario)
- McIrvine School
- Old Fort Frances High School
- Westfort High School

Northwest Catholic District School Board

- St. Michael's Catholic School
- St Francis School

== Media ==
=== Newspapers ===
- Fort Frances Times – Weekly
- Fort Frances Bulletin – Twice Weekly

=== Online media ===
- Fort Frances Times Online

=== Television stations ===
The only local television channel serving Fort Frances is the Shaw TV community channel on Shaw Cable channel 10.

There are no local broadcast outlets or repeaters serving Fort Frances; Shaw Cable carries CBWT-DT (CBC), CBWFT-DT (Ici Radio-Canada Télé) and CKY-DT (CTV) from Winnipeg, CITV-DT (Global) from Edmonton, and TVO, plus CITY-DT (Citytv), CHCH-DT (independent), CFTM-DT (TVA, live feed) and TFO. CJBN-TV from Kenora used to be available on cable until it permanently signed off on January 27, 2017.

United States network programming on Shaw TV comes from Detroit (WDIV-TV, WXYZ-TV, WWJ-TV, and WTVS) and Rochester (WUHF); stations from the Duluth television market are not available on cable, though they are available over-the-air from repeaters in International Falls.

=== Radio stations ===
- FM 89.1 – CKSB-9-FM (Ici Radio-Canada Première, repeats CKSB-10-FM, Saint Boniface, Manitoba)
- FM 90.5 – CBQQ-FM (CBC Radio One, repeats CBQT-FM, Thunder Bay)
- FM 93.1 – CFOB-FM, 93.1 The Border FM hot adult contemporary

Another radio station, CKWO FM 92.3 The Wolf, was licensed to the neighbouring Couchiching First Nation in 2003 and launched in 2004. Its unknown when the station left the air; the CRTC renewed CKWO-FM's licence from 1 September 2012 to 28 February 2013, with no known license renewals since that date.

== Notable people ==
- Dave Allison, former coach of the NHL's Ottawa Senators
- Mike Allison, former player for the Los Angeles Kings, Toronto Maple Leafs, and New York Rangers of the NHL
- Steve Arpin, ARCA Re/Max Series and NASCAR Nationwide Series race car driver
- Murray Bannerman, former player for the Chicago Blackhawks.
- Terril Calder, artist and animator.
- Molly Carlson, high diver
- Keith Christiansen, former player for the WHA Minnesota Fighting Saints.
- Todd Dufresne, social and cultural theorist best known for his work on Freud and psychoanalysis
- Gene Eugene, actor, musician and recording producer
- Howard Hampton, Member of Provincial Parliament (Ontario) of Kenora—Rainy River (provincial electoral district) and former leader of the Ontario New Democratic Party.
- Duncan Keith, NHL hockey player of the Chicago Blackhawks, named one of the 100 Greatest NHL Players
- Chris Lindberg, silver medalist with the Canadian Ice Hockey Team at the 1992 Winter Olympics
- Neil Sheehy, former player for the Calgary Flames, Hartford Whalers and Washington Capitals of the NHL.
- Timothy Sheehy, former NHL player.
- Gene Stoltzfus, founding director of Christian Peacemaker Teams
