= Emo, Ontario =

Emo
- Township (single-tier)
- Township of Emo
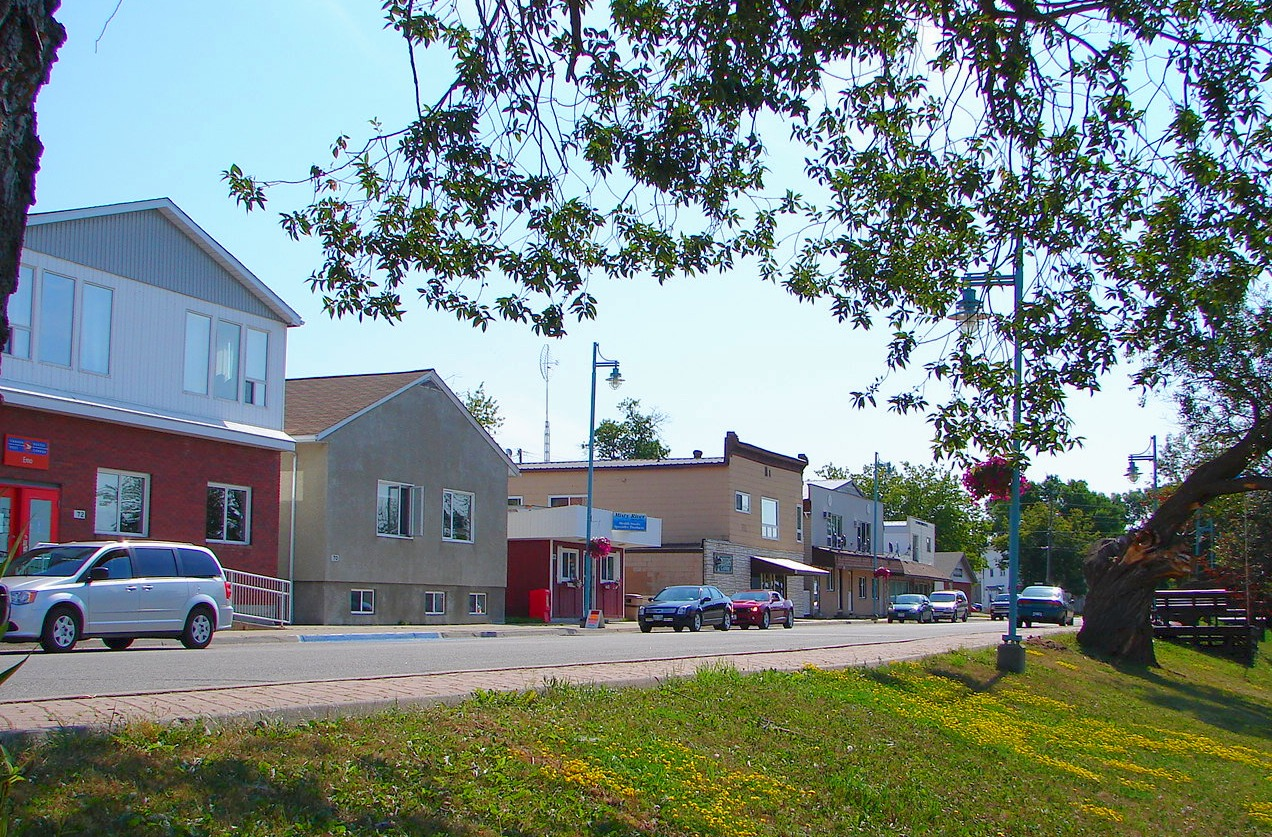

- Location within Ontario
- Coordinates: 48°38′N 93°50′W
- Country: Canada
- Province: Ontario
- District: Rainy River
- Settled: 1880s
- Incorporated: 1899

Government
  - Type: Township
  - Mayor: Harold McQuaker
  - Fed. riding: Thunder Bay—Rainy River
  - Prov. riding: Kenora—Rainy River

Area
  - Land: 202.28 km^{2} (78.10 sq mi)
- Elevation: 350 m (1,150 ft)

Population (2021)
  - Total: 1,204
  - Density: 6/km^{2} (16/sq mi)
- Time zone: UTC-6 (CST)
  - Summer (DST): UTC-5 (CDT)
- Postal code: P0W 1E0
- Area code: 807
- Website: www.emo.ca

Emo is a small rural township, located along the Rainy River near the southwestern corner of northern Ontario, Canada, on the U.S. border directly north of the state of Minnesota. Emo had a population of 1,333 in the Canada 2016 Census and a population of 1,204 in the 2021 census.

It is known for its stock car races, its picturesque, family-friendly waterfront park, the annual Rainy River Agricultural Fair (cattle industry is key in the area) and the Emo Walleye Classic fishing tournament.

== History ==
Emo was officially created on July 1, 1899, and celebrated its centennial in 1999. Emo's first reeve was Alexander Luttrell, an Irishman who named the town after a namesake village in Ireland near where he was born. The council was composed of Charles Fisher, John Dungey, Benjamin Phillips, and Thomas Shortreed.

The post office, Emo River, dates from 1887.

== Climate ==
Emo has a four-season humid continental climate with extreme temperature differences between summer and winter. The daily mean difference between January and July is as much as 34 °C.

Climate data for Emo
Month	Jan	Feb	Mar	Apr	May	Jun	Jul	Aug	Sep	Oct	Nov	Dec	Year
Record high °C (°F)	7.5 (45.5)	13.0 (55.4)	20.0 (68.0)	32.0 (89.6)	32.5 (90.5)	37.0 (98.6)	36.0 (96.8)	35.0 (95.0)	33.5 (92.3)	29.0 (84.2)	22.0 (71.6)	9.0 (48.2)	37.0 (98.6)
Mean daily maximum °C (°F)	−9.4 (15.1)	−5.3 (22.5)	1.5 (34.7)	10.7 (51.3)	18.4 (65.1)	22.9 (73.2)	25.3 (77.5)	24.5 (76.1)	18.1 (64.6)	10.3 (50.5)	0.2 (32.4)	−7.8 (18.0)	9.1 (48.4)
Daily mean °C (°F)	−16.1 (3.0)	−12.3 (9.9)	−5.0 (23.0)	3.5 (38.3)	10.8 (51.4)	15.5 (59.9)	18.4 (65.1)	17.4 (63.3)	11.7 (53.1)	4.8 (40.6)	−4.4 (24.1)	−13.2 (8.2)	2.6 (36.7)
Mean daily minimum °C (°F)	−22.7 (−8.9)	−19.2 (−2.6)	−11.7 (10.9)	−3.7 (25.3)	3.1 (37.6)	8.6 (47.5)	11.4 (52.5)	10.4 (50.7)	5.2 (41.4)	−0.7 (30.7)	−9.0 (15.8)	−18.7 (−1.7)	−3.9 (24.9)
Record low °C (°F)	−49.0 (−56.2)	−49.0 (−56.2)	−43.0 (−45.4)	−27.5 (−17.5)	−11.0 (12.2)	−3.5 (25.7)	−0.5 (31.1)	−3.5 (25.7)	−7.5 (18.5)	−20.0 (−4.0)	−44.0 (−47.2)	−46.0 (−50.8)	−49.0 (−56.2)
Average precipitation mm (inches)	32.5 (1.28)	24.4 (0.96)	31.6 (1.24)	45.4 (1.79)	78.3 (3.08)	130.0 (5.12)	110.0 (4.33)	85.0 (3.35)	82.6 (3.25)	62.2 (2.45)	51.9 (2.04)	35.5 (1.40)	769.4 (30.29)
Average snowfall cm (inches)	32.2 (12.7)	20.9 (8.2)	21.3 (8.4)	12.9 (5.1)	1.3 (0.5)	0.0 (0.0)	0.0 (0.0)	0.0 (0.0)	1.3 (0.5)	10.0 (3.9)	36.5 (14.4)	33.9 (13.3)	170.3 (67)
Average precipitation days	10	9	8	12	14	13	12	12	13	12	11	12	138
Source: Environment Canada

== Demographics ==
In the 2021 Census of Population conducted by Statistics Canada, Emo had a population of 1,204 living in 472 of its 521 total private dwellings, a change of −9.7% from its 2016 population of 1,333. With a land area of 202.28 km^{2} (78.10 sq mi), it had a population density of 6.0/km^{2} (15.4/sq mi) in 2021.

Canada census – Emo community profile

	2021	2016	2011
Population	1,204 (−9.7% from 2016)	1,333 (+6.5% from 2011)	1,252 (-4.1% from 2006)
Land area	202.28 km^{2} (78.10 sq mi)	203.09 km^{2} (78.41 sq mi)	203.54 km^{2} (78.59 sq mi)
Population density	6.0/km^{2} (16/sq mi)	6.6/km^{2} (17/sq mi)	6.2/km^{2} (16/sq mi)
Median age	41.2 (M: 41.2, F: 41.2)	40.5 (M: 39.3, F: 41.1)	41.4 (M: 40.3, F: 41.9)
Private dwellings	521 (total) 472 (occupied)	554 (total)	483 (total)
Median household income	$94,000	$75,593

References: 2021 2016 2011

Historical census populations – Emo, Ontario

Year	Pop.	±%
1901	730	—
1911	874	+19.7%
1921	1,204	+37.8%
1931	1,191	−1.1%
1941	1,217	+2.2%
1951	1,201	−1.3%
1956	1,147	−4.5%

Year	Pop.	±%
1961	1,111	−3.1%
1966	1,093	−1.6%
1971	1,110	+1.6%
1976	1,119	+0.8%
1981	1,114	−0.4%
1986	1,127	+1.2%
1991	1,275	+13.1%

Year	Pop.	±%
1996	1,366	+7.1%
2001	1,331	−2.6%
2006	1,305	−2.0%
2011	1,252	−4.1%
2016	1,333	+6.5%
2021	1,204	−9.7%

Source: Statistics Canada

== Local government ==
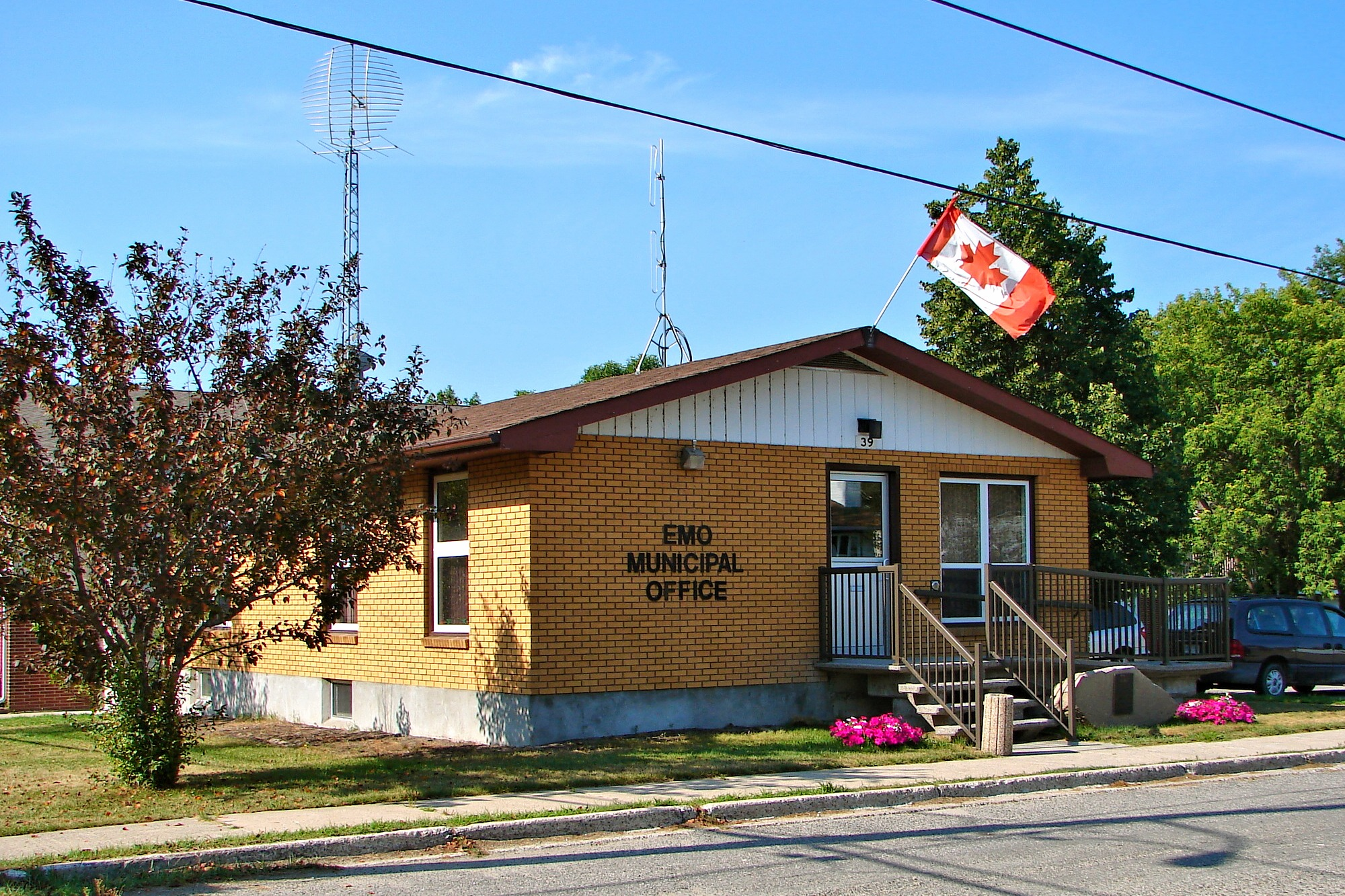
Municipal office

Emo is located in the Rainy River District. The current serving (acclaimed) mayor is Harold McQuaker, while Lisa Teeple, Harrold Boven, Phil Whatley, and Gerald Weiringa serve as councillors. Elections are held every four years, in October.

=== Pride flag controversy ===
In 2020, Borderland Pride requested that the township of Emo recognize June as Pride Month and fly the Pride flag outside their municipal office. The town council voted 3–2 against this request, with Emo mayor Harold McQuaker commenting “There’s no flag being flown for the other side of the coin ... there’s no flags being flown for the straight people”. This resulted in Borderland Pride protesting by staging their own Pride Parade in Emo.

In 2024, the Ontario Human Rights Tribunal ruled against the township and ordered them to pay $15,000 in compensation to Borderland Pride, with $5,000 of the fine coming from Harold McQuaker. The tribunal also ordered McQuaker and the Chief Administrative Officer of the municipality to complete a "Human Rights 101" training course, which is offered by the Ontario Human Rights Commission, within 30 days. Borderland Pride had previously offered to donate a third of their settlement to the Emo Public Library if they agreed to host a “drag story time event”.

The tribunal's decision will face judicial review. A group contesting the decision intends to argues the decision is contrary to free expression rights, and that the tribunal did not apply the ordinary legal tests for balancing expression and equality in Canadian law.

== Amenities ==
Emo is about halfway between two bridges to the United States, one at Fort Frances (approximately a 30-minute drive) and the other at Rainy River (about 40 minutes by road). It is identified in many cycling resources as an excellent overnight stopping point because of the facilities (shelter, showers and bathrooms) available in the waterfront park.

There are many volunteer groups and a strong sense of community in Emo. In Emo's Lion's Park, a picturesque riverfront area, a new play structure was funded through volunteer fundraising efforts, and a 2005-2006 fiscal year grant from the Ontario Trillium Foundation . The park is also home to the Emo Spray Park, a $500,000 community-driven project completed in July 2010. A safe way for kids to engage in water play, the spray park attracts thousands of visitors in the summertime.

The spring brings the opening of the walleye fishing season, and the annual Emo Walleye Classic.

The Emo Speedway draws race participants and fans from the central United States, Northwestern Ontario and Manitoba. The track is a 600-metre, high-banked dirt oval track which operates every Saturday from May through Mid-September.

Emo is also home to churches of four different Christian denominations, including Knox United Church of Canada, as well as Baptist, Catholic, and Christian Reformed churches.

The Emo Food Bank and Thrift Shop, located in what was formerly the Anglican Church, helps hundreds of area residents in need every year.

Initially located in private homes of local women, the town library was moved to the schoolhouse in 1940 and to its own building in the 50s.

== Emo Walleye Classic ==
The Emo Walleye Classic is a two-day catch and release fishing tournament held annually in Emo, during the final week of May each year. Established in 2000, it takes place on the Rainy River, which marks the border between Minnesota and Ontario.

Upwards of sixty Canadian and American teams of two participate each year, each paying a participation fee ($500 in 2015). An organizing committee and many local volunteers assist at the event, and many local businesses and individuals sponsor the event.

== See also ==
- List of townships in Ontario
