= Ostry (disambiguation) =

Ostry may refer to:

== Places ==
- Ostry, a stratovolcano in eastern Russia
- Ostrý, a mountain on the Czech–German border

== People ==
- Bernard Ostry (1927–2006), Canadian author
- David Ostry, American neuroscientist
- Jonathan D. Ostry (born 1962), Canadian economist
- Sylvia Ostry (born 1927), Canadian economist
