= Judith Maxwell =

Canadian political scientist and economist

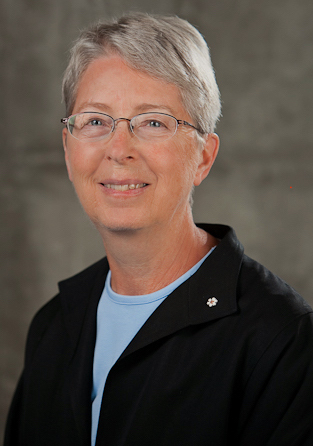
- Born: 1943 (age 82–83); Kingston, Ontario, Canada

Academic work
- Institutions: Dalhousie University; LSE

Judith Maxwell (born c. 1943) is a co-founder of Synapcity. She received her bachelor's degree in commerce from Dalhousie University in 1963. From 1994 to 2006 she was the President of the Canadian Policy Research Network (CPRN). Prior to that, she was the Chair of the Economic Council of Canada. Her involvements in the public and private sectors have led her to receive honorary degrees from eight Canadian universities and a community college.

== Education ==
Judith Maxwell received her Bachelor of Commerce degree from Dalhousie University in 1963. Her balance of academic success and extracurricular activities led her to be named the class historian. She then spent a year reading history and political science at the London School of Economics.

== Career ==
Early in her professional life, she devoted her career to the intricate field of economic and political studies. She started off as a researcher for the Combines Investigation Branch of the Federal Ministry of Consumer and Corporate Affairs. From 1966 to 1972, she was a journalist at the Financial Times of Canada. From 1972 to 1979 she was Director of Policy Studies at the C.D. Howe Institute, focusing on economic and social issues. From 1980 to 1985 she worked as an economics consultant, first, for Esso Europe in London, and then, in Montreal, for the economics practice at Coopers & Lybrand.

=== Economic Council of Canada ===
From 1985 to 1992, Judith Maxwell was the Chair of the Economic Council of Canada. This council was established in 1963 with the main objective of creating a census to achieve social and economic goals via long-term and medium-term planning. As a Crown corporation, the council reports went directly through the prime minister to the Parliament. Doctor Sylvia Ostry and Judith Maxwell were the two women who were separately appointed to serve for seven years each as chair of the council. Maxwell's role as the chief executive officer meant she had to supervise and direct the work and staff of the council. At the time of her appointment, government officials suggested to her that they felt the council did not have a significant impact on policy debates. Her task was to make the council's reports more readable and to focus on the "human" issues. Her ways to solve these issues were subtle and distinctive.

=== Canadian Policy Research Networks ===
From 1994 to 2005, she founded and became President of the Canadian Policy Research Networks. Her work here involved inviting provincial and federal officials, community leaders, and academics from a wide spectrum of disciplines—gathering them around the same table to encourage better policy making in response to the needs of citizens. She proved to be "cogent and persuasive -- and an intellectual leader of remarkable vision," according to Arthur Kroeger, who chaired the CPRN board. [Citation: Preface to "Essays by Judith Maxwell".] She excelled in public debates about social and economic issues in Canada. She brought her past experience and knowledge to prosper this non-profit think tank.

=== Synapcity (formerly Citizens Academy). ===
She was a co-founder of this community organization, encouraging residents of Ottawa to learn how to implement change in their own community—by giving them the skills to solve problems at the local level across the city.

== Awards ==
Judith Maxwell has received Honorary Degrees from eight Canadian universities and a community college. In 1993 she received the Public Policy Forum Award for Distinguished Service to Canada. In 1996 she was made a Member of the Order of Canada. In 2017 she received the Award of Distinction from the Ottawa Economics Association.

== Selected works ==
Judith Maxwell's most cited works are in the fields of economics, political science, and sociology. Her research focuses on the health and well-being of families, workers, men, women and children.

=== Articles ===
- Maxwell, J. B., & Pestieau, C. (1980). Economic Realities of Contemporary Confederation (Vol. 14). CD Howe Research Institute.
- Maxwell, J., Rosell, S., & Forest, P. (2003). Giving citizens a voice in healthcare policy in Canada. Bmj, 326(7397), 1031–1033. doi:10.1136/bmj.326.7397.1031
- Maxwell, J., Jackson, K., Legowski, B., Rosell, S., Yankelovich, D., Forest, P. G., & Lozowchuck, L. (2002). A Citizens Dialogue on the Future of Health Care in Canada. A Report for the Commission on the Future of Health Care in Canada.
- Maxwell, J., & Currie, S. (1984). Partnership for growth: Corporate-university cooperation in Canada. Forum.

=== Books ===
- Maxwell, J. (2005). "The First Ten Years:Essays by Judith Maxwell," President, 1994-2005
- Maxwell, J. (2002). Smart Social Policy-" Making Work Pay"(p. 4). Ottawa, ON: Canadian Policy Research Networks.
- Maxwell, J. (1973). Energy from the Arctic: facts and issues(Vol. 36). Canadian-American Committee.
