= Jeffrey Orridge =

Television executive

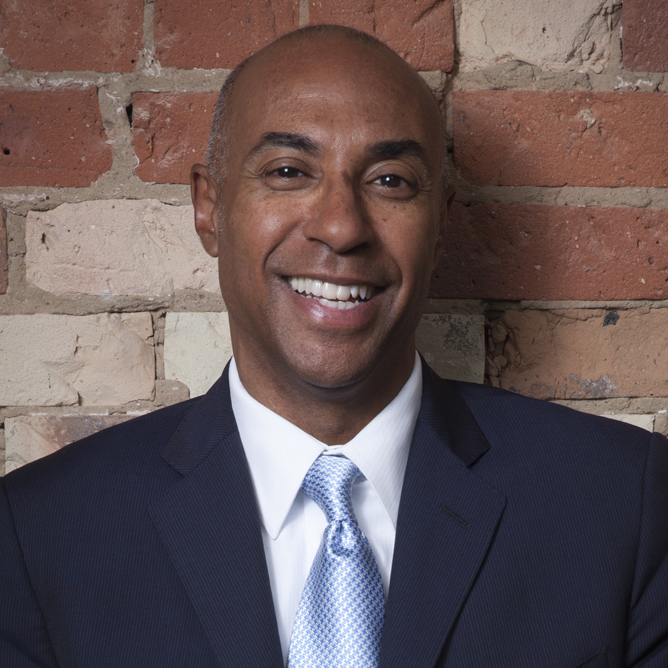
- Orridge during first year as CFL Commissioner
- Born: Jeffrey Lyndon Orridge; 1960 (age 65–66); New York City, U.S.
- Known for: CEO of TVOntario, Commissioner of the Canadian Football League; Executive Director of CBC Sports; General Counsel, USA Basketball

Jeffrey Lyndon Orridge (born 1960) is the CEO of The King's Trust Canada. Previously, he was the chief executive officer of TVOntario, the provincial educational television network. He was appointed effective November 30, 2020 and announced his resignation July 22, 2025. Previously he was 13th commissioner of the Canadian Football League (CFL) and was the first African-American chief executive of a major North American sports league. Earlier in his career, Orridge was COO of Right to Play and executive director of CBC Sports Properties.

== Early life and education ==
Orridge is a New York native. His mother was a registered nurse and social worker and his father worked for the New York City Transit Authority. Orridge participated in track and field and played basketball in school until he tore his ACL. He graduated from the Collegiate School. He earned a psychology degree from Amherst College in 1982, and graduated from Harvard Law School in 1986.

== Career ==
After graduating from law school, Orridge joined the corporate law firm Rogers & Wells before becoming executive director of Home Attendant Corp. at North General Hospital. In 1991, he became head of business and legal affairs at USA Basketball, the governing body for the Olympic sport. He was the organization's first in-house attorney. He left the organization in 1994 and joined Reebok International. In the mid to late 1990s, he became global sports marketing director for Reebok International, and was sports licensing director for Warner Bros. Consumer Products. He also was senior vice president and general manager for Momentum Worldwide, in the early 2000s, and as chief marketing officer for OneNetNow, and was vice-president of worldwide licensing and entertainment and new business development for Mattel Inc.

In 2007, he was named chief operating officer at Right to Play in Canada, an organization that focused on the use of sports and play for development with children in disadvantaged countries, until 2011. In April 2011, Orridge became executive director of CBC Sports Properties. Orridge also was general manager for the Olympics on CBC. It was during this period that CBC Sports lost the broadcast rights to Hockey Night in Canada.

In March 2015, Orridge became the first African-American chief executive of a major North American sports league when he became the 13th commissioner of the Canadian Football League (CFL). In April 2017, it was announced that due to philosophical differences between Orridge and the board of governors over the future of the CFL, Orridge would step down from his position as commissioner of the CFL, effective June 30, 2017. His final day as CFL commissioner was June 15, 2017, with Jim Lawson taking over the Commissioner role on an interim basis. He was succeeded by Randy Ambrosie as commissioner on July 5, 2017.

Under Orridge's leadership at TVOntario, the provincial broadcaster experienced the first labour strike in its history of more than half a century. Notably, he oversaw the end of the organization's long-running flagship program The Agenda with Steve Paikin.

== Controversy ==
In 2016, Orridge received media attention after saying there was no conclusive link between playing in the CFL and developing chronic traumatic encephalopathy (CTE), a progressive degenerative disease of the brain found in athletes (and others) with a history of repetitive brain trauma. At the time, there was a $200 million class-action lawsuit in Canada's courts on behalf of CFL players seeking monetary compensation for CTE.

Preceded by Lisa de Wilde	CEO of TVOntario; 2020–present	Succeeded by incumbent
