= Economic Council of Canada =

Former Crown corporation

The Economic Council of Canada was an independent economic advisory body established as a federal Crown Corporation by the Government of Canada in 1963. Its purpose was to report on a wide range of pressing matters relating to Canada's economic development, focusing on five main economic objectives: full employment, sustained economic growth, price stability, equitable distribution of rising incomes, and a viable balance of payments. The council was dissolved alongside six other government organizations in 1993.

== Governance, staff and budget ==
The council was overseen by a chair (actually, "Chairman"), two deputy chairs and directors (with one deputy position being Director only until 1987), and not more than 25 part-time board members. The chairs and deputies were appointed by the prime minister and the board members by the governor in council. The chair was the chief executive officer and had responsibility for supervision over and direction of the work of the staff. All signed the reviews and research reports, with dissent being rare. The council reported to a minister of Parliament "as may be designated by the Governor in Council to act as the Minister responsible for purpose of the Act." Initially, this minister was Maurice Lamontagne, secretary of state, who had strongly supported the establishment of the council; by the mid-1960s it was the prime minister of Canada whom the council reported to. All the council's funding came from the federal government, via the finance and industry ministers. There were six chairs (plus one interim), as follows:

- John J. Deutsch (1963–1967)
- Arthur J.R. Smith (1968–1971)
- André Raynauld (1972–1976)
- George Post, Interim (1978)
- Sylvia Ostry (1978–1979)
- David W. Slater (1980–1985)
- Judith Maxwell (1985–1992)

The Chairs were appointed by the prime minister for seven years, but most served for four years, and four of them served as a deputy chair for several years before being appointed as Chairs. Four of them were experienced public servants: Deutsch, Post, Ostry, and Slater. Deutsch stepped down when he was appointed Principal of Queen's University. Smith went on to lead the Conference Board of Canada and several corporate boards. Raynauld was a University of Montreal professor, who left the council to serve a term in the Quebec National Assembly, and then went back to the university. Before the council, Ostry had been head of Statistics Canada and after leaving she took up a number of senior positions at the Organization for Economic Cooperation and Development, the then Department of International Trade, and some universities. Slater had been a senior Department of Finance official before being appointed to the council. After the Council closed in 1992, Maxwell founded another think tank, the Canadian Policy Research Networks

Council Board members were appointed to represent their province and their sector of society – business, labour, agriculture and consumers. The first members were appointed in December 1963 and the first meeting of the council, along with the Chairs and Vice-chairs, was conducted in January 1964. They were expected to participate in a consensus process to set priorities for the council's research and analysis and were collectively responsible for the conclusions and recommendations contained in its major reports and statements. Members were also able to write a dissent to be included in the final report.

For the fiscal year 1965–66, the number of council staff was reported as being "about 100 including some 40 professionals drawn from federal and provincial department and agencies, business firms, labour organizations, universities and internal institutions" For that year, expenditures were about $1,254,000 (all current dollars), compared to about $947,000 in 1964–65, its first full year of operation. By 1973, staff numbered 128, comprising 72 researchers and other professional staff and 56 support staff, with another 71 persons being engaged in 62 external contracts. Expenditures were just over $3 million in 1972–73. In 1983, there were 60 economists.

== Roles and origins ==
The council served three main roles, as follows:

- research/analytical: its staff of economists and specialists assessed medium/long-term economic prospects compared to potential, and gathered data for conducting in-depth economic analyses and studies of various economic issues and trends;
- consultative: it encouraged maximum consultation among, and sought the advice of, labour and management, agencies of federal and provincial governments, and the Canadian public and academia, often by convening major conferences and colloquia; and
- advisory/planning/educational: Council leaders and staff produced reports and papers and then held press releases, gave speeches, and sponsored and attended conferences about its research and policy recommendations, in order to increase the level of understanding and debate on economic issues and forward-looking potential solutions among the public (federal and provincial) and private policy-makers, as well as the press and the public at large.

These functions corresponded to research needs perceived in the early post-World War II period that the council was designed and established to address. The first concerned economic research and policy-making capacity. In 1963, just prior to its establishment, a Royal Commission had found that little economic research was being carried out by the federal government and there were few non-governmental, non-academic research bodies doing the same. The commission also identified a lack of economic data, weak understanding of the principles of economic analysis, and meagre economic reporting in the press, which gaps the council would be able to fill. Indeed, the council's Annual Reviews were immediately seen as contributing to public information, as Canada had not, until the council's inception, a body of informed economic policy critics that would attract attention from the government. Also, there was apparent need to address a wider range of economic issues than just poor productivity growth, which was the focus of the council's predecessor organization, the National Productivity Council, which was disbanded with the creation of the council.

Moreover, there had been a perception of insufficient research focus on longer-term economic and social problems leading to ad hoc policy and program treatments. Thus, the Economic Council was mandated to provide medium/long-term outlooks on a range of economic and social issues. This more or less institutionalized the work of periodic Royal Commissions, such as the 1957 Royal Commission of Economic Prospects (Walter Gordon), which typically had a longer-term focus in terms of research and policy-making. Short-term policy-making was left to the Department of Finance and other federal departments, as it had been. However, when the Council realized the difficulty in separating short- from long-term policy objectives and adopted shorter term horizons using three-year performance indicators in 1972, tension between it and Finance arose and remained.

The second major need the council addressed was that, in the 1950s and early 1960s, there was growing interest in consultation and consensus-building. The Progressive Conservative Party (in power from 1957 to 1963) and the Liberal Party (before it was elected in 1963) had developed ideas for broader business and labour participation in economic decision-making. Moreover, many began to recognize that economic growth was falling behind that of the European countries which relied more systematically on tripartism. Thus, consultation with business and labour was to be an important aspect of the council's work. It was this lack of ideological positions and its consultative nature, along with its independence, that stood the council apart from other economic research organizations of the time and lent greater weight to its research and policy conclusions and prescriptions.

However, the consultative model adopted for the council in developing policy prescriptions – involving business and labour (and academia) – could not be said to be tripartism as understood in Europe and originally envisioned for the council, in that government did not participate in the process. Moreover, this model led to competition and rivalry between the council and government policy centres concerned with finance, employment, immigration and industry, each of which had its own policy/programming priorities and did not feel obligated to take account of the council's findings and recommendations. This became another source of tension between the council and central departments that lingered throughout its life.

== Changing context and closure ==
The council faced two major changes in its environment over the years. The first major change, occurring in the mid-1970s during a period of rapid inflation, was a weakening of board consensus, one of the distinguishing features of the Council model. In response to rising inflation, the federal government, in 1974, prepared to introduce wage and price controls which the labour movement adamantly opposed. After much discussion, the Canadian Labour Congress (CLC) members resigned from the council as they did from all forms of government cooperation. While a few labour spokespersons unaffiliated with the CLC continued to participate as council members, the loss of CLC participation signaled the end of official labour representation at the council. However, this must be viewed as part of a larger labour withdrawal from government—not specifically aimed at the council, as it remained highly critical of the government's anti-inflationary policies. Nevertheless, this lack of strong labour representation may have negatively impacted the council's credibility as a fully consultative body (though much research was carried out in the following years, as the final section shows).

The second major change in the context was growing competition for the council. When the council was launched in 1963, only two national non-profit, semi-private think tanks existed in Canada – the Conference Board of Canada and the Private Planning Association of Canada (PPAC, renamed the C.D. Howe Institute in 1973). However, by 1983, there were other players in the research mix. Federal government departments had built and were funding their own economics analysis teams sometimes in conflict with the council. As well, the number of private, academic and other non-profit think tanks and policy centres had grown over the previous 20 years, many of them with certain advantages over the council. In particular, in addition to the CD Howe Institute (which began in 1958 as the PPAC as just mentioned), there were three other competing national non-profit think tanks that launched in the early 1970s -- Canada West Foundation in Calgary, Institute for Research on Public Policy (IRPP) in Montreal, and the Fraser Institute in Vancouver—and relied on an endowment or donations, funding sources not open to the council. Also, these research organizations could generally be speedier in their economic commentary, as many were not constrained by the need for the time-consuming activity of consensus-building within their boards when publishing reports, as the council was.

Then, in February 1992, during a period of government expenditure constraint, the federal Minister of Finance, Don Mazankowski, announced in the budget the implementation of streamlining measures to reduce the cost of government. Among the measures implemented were the elimination, consolidation, deferral and privatization of 46 organizations, including the Economic Council of Canada. In this Budget document, two main reasons were given for the closure.

First, the "Situation Report" of the Budget indicated that, though the council had fulfilled its original mandate, hard economic times dictated its elimination: "[It] was created by statute in 1963 with a mandate to provide independent advice to the government on matters related to the growth of Canada's economy. The Council has performed a valuable service over the years, but at this time of restraint, the government has had to carefully assess priorities for the limited funding available for arm's-length research and advice."However, it should pointed that this austerity exercise had been driven by the Department of Finance, which is where, of course, key funding decisions were (and are) made. Given the aforementioned tension between the Council and Finance (and other central government bodies), as to the former's policymaking and independence in doing so, it is perhaps not surprising that, in a time of constraint, Finance would have taken the opportunity to make the decision to cut the Council.

A second justification given by the federal government for closing the Council was lack of need. As observed above, there were few credible economic policy think-tanks in Canada when it was created in 1963, but by the 1980s and 1990s there were several, thus reducing the Council's value added and reducing the effective cost of closing it in 1991. The government believed that the Council's research mandate was being (or could be) met by existing private and non-profit organizations. In its words: "In the years since the creation of the Council, there ha[d] been a considerable growth in the number and quality of organizations and individuals outside government conducting independent research on economic issues." However, it should be said that, since the council's closure, though there have been (and are) well-established public and non-profit think tanks producing policy-relevant research on a range of economic topics, few have had (or have) the resources, or the incentive to focus a significant amount of their resources, on one issue for two or three years using a substantial team of highly paid researchers, as the council had.

No official explanation was ever given for the council's closure, other than the stated fiscal consolidation and perceived lack of rationale. However, a potential reason cited in the press was its estimation of a "low" cost of Quebec separation from Canada, which finding ran counter to the federal government's obvious orientation toward unity. This estimate was presented in what turned out to be the last Annual Review of the Economic Council in October 1991. However, this was essentially (and rightly, given the council's mandate) a measure of the economic cost of separation, and, as admitted, did not consider separation's political, social and cultural costs.

== Contributions ==
Over the council's life, from 1963 to 1992, the council carried out a large amount of research on a wide range of important issues of the day, producing a substantial number of publications, most of which can be obtained on the Government of Canada publications website (see the final section for an elaboration of what the Council published). Out of this research emerged important breakthroughs and messages that, anecdotally, engendered much thought if not political action, and still resonate in the 2020s. Several examples of what the Council contributed follow:

- it contributed to government policy and programming decisions, whereby it was asked, on a number of occasions, to testify and elaborate upon issues (many of which the council would have identified) being deliberated upon by House of Commons and Senate committees, examples including aging, technological change, poverty, and consumer credit;
- it developed, in partnership with a number of government bodies, the CANDIDE forecasting model, one of the first of its kind, which enabled the council and others to effectively conduct longer term analysis;
- it examined and advocated the use of social indicators to better capture Canadians' well-being, beyond the purely economic as the GNP does, in areas such as crime and health;
- it conducted, in the late 1970s, a (then rare) employer-based survey in an era of rising skill shortages that determined that employers were experiencing vacancies mainly for high-skill manufacturing/machining and engineering/science jobs and were dealing with the shortages typically by using only short-term training;
- it analyzed government regulation of the economy and suggested there would be major economic gains from the relaxation of regulatory restrictions, particularly in transportation, telecommunications and agriculture; and from testing and possibly imposing marketable rights in fisheries and trade-able emission incentives in the environmental protection area;
- it advocated for freer trade by identifying its positive impacts on the economy;
- it comprehensively examined two regions of Canada facing economic swings and downturns: the Prairies, specifically the potential need for industrial diversification in light of the region's dependence on oil and gas and other natural resources and the attendant variation in prices and incomes; and Newfoundland, specifically the need for new measures in the province in the face of the cod fishery collapse and the seemingly perpetual cycle of unemployment and low productivity;
- it emphasized competition policies to improve market efficiency, which led to the establishment of a new Department of Consumer and Corporate Affairs and changes to the Combines Act;
- it observed rapid demographic and industrial changes in the mid-1960s and identified the need for greater labour supply management, which led to the creation of the then federal Department of Manpower and Immigration and the implementation of various human resource programs by the department, as well as greater public support for education and training and job-oriented training in post-secondary institutions;
- very topically now in the 2020s as the post-War Baby Boomers age, it analyzed the effects of population aging on seniors' income support and overall health care costs;
- in the mid-1980s, it was one the first organizations to quantify the rapid changes in technology occurring in the workplace, along with the differences in their impacts according to industry, occupation, skill level, gender, and earnings level; and the need for adjustment to the changes as to training, transfers and layoffs, and organizational changes;
- in light of rapid changes in goods and service production in the 1980s and early 1990s, it conducted a survey of employers experiencing rapid technological change and observed the consequent greater use of innovative workplace human-resource management practices, such as variable pay and flexible scheduling, some of which had positive effects on firms and workers in terms of, for example, lower turnover and job stress and higher wages and skills and productivity;
- it documented the changing face of immigration and its positive effects on the economy;
- it documented the changing composition of those in poverty and their income security needs;
- its research pointed to the value of community-level economic development;
- it documented the growing service sector in the 1980s and the impact this was having on the labour market and job quality, in terms of skills, wages, benefits, training, tenure and working conditions; and
- in a comprehensive examination of the way the education and training systems prepare youth for employment, it identified a number of ways to measure and improve the transition, in the areas of achievement (e.g., reduced literacy and drop-outs), job preparation (e.g., higher placement and skilled instructors), and greater accessibility as to females, indigenous peoples and income).

== Publications ==
This section outlines most of the council research output from 1963 to the mid-1990s, some of which was highlighted in the previous section and the majority of which is available on the government of Canada's website. Each of the following is described in turn below.

- 28 Annual Reviews (one for each year of its existence);
- 22 major studies, generating Research Reports and/or Statements (Council-signed);
- 10 reference studies, producing 13 final Reference reports;
- 17 conferences, workshops, seminars, and colloquia, generating summary reports; and
- a very large number of individually authored research studies and discussion papers. the majority of which being associated with the vehicles above.

=== Annual Reviews ===
The council was required by legislation to publish an Annual Review containing a report on medium/long-term economic prospects and problems for Canada, which it did every year from 1964 to 1991. Each Review was signed by the chairs, the deputy chairs, and the board members though sometimes with dissents from one or more members. The Reviews also contained the results of research on one or more economic issues of the day, See table below for examples:

Review, Year and Title	Additional Issues Addressed
1st, 1964 Economic Goals for Canada to 1970	
2nd, 1965, Towards Sustained and Balanced Economic Growth	Education
3rd, 1966 Prices, Productivity, and Employment	Regional development
4th, 1967 The Canadian Economy: From the 1960's to the 1970's	Manufacturing scale and specialization Urban growth Human resources in primary industries
5th, 1968 The Challenge of Growth and Change	Science and technology and social sciences Poverty
6th, 1969 Perspective 1975	Poverty
7th, 1970 Patterns of Growth	Higher education Health care
10th, 1973 Shaping the Expansion (the source link contains only a summary of this Review)	
11th, 1974 Economic Targets and Social Indicators	Social indicators
12th, 1975 Options for Growth	Social trends
13th, 1976 The Inflation Dilemma	
14th, 1977 Into the 1980s	
15th, 1978 A Time for Reason	Service industries Equity
16^{th,} 1979 Two Cheers for the Eighties	Household saving
17th, 1980 A Climate of Uncertainty	Regional disparity
18th, 1981 Room for Manoeuvre	
19th, 1982 Lean Times: Policies and Constraints	Energy policies Housing
20th, 1983 On the Mend	Social policies Women and work
21st, 1984 Steering the Course	Govt spending and public debt Employment, unemployment, tech change
22nd, 1985 Strengthening Growth: Options and Constraint	
23rd, 1986 Changing Times	Managing resources
24th, 1987 Reaching Outward	Global economy
25th, 1988 Back to Basics	Labour market Global economy
26th, 1989 Legacies	Global economy Social well-being, aging The environment
27th, 1990 Transitions for the 90s	Global economy Unemployment
28th, 1991 A Joint Venture: The Economics of Constitutional Options	The economic union and fiscal federalism Re-confederation options

=== Major Studies: Research Reports and Statements (Council-Signed) ===
The council was also empowered to conduct research studies and inquiries on its own initiative on topics of the day. The final products of these studies came in the form of a Research Report and/or Statement, the latter being a condensed version of the former for press-release purposes and wider dissemination and containing recommendations. Considered to be the "flagship" products of the council along with the Reviews, these publications were signed by the Council board (though occasionally not unanimously). These studies were carried out by council researchers working in a council project group, often along with external researchers, and spanned more than one year of analysis and reporting. From the research projects also arose individually authored reports and discussion papers; see below. Among the subjects covered by these studies, as highlighted above, were the following: trade, skills and education, the effects of technological change on jobs, pensions, financial regulation, community and regional economic development, the Canada-USA Trade Agreement, education and training, poverty, productivity, the growth of the service sector, and the social and economic impacts of immigration. A complete list of the Research Reports and Statements, along with the source and a short description of each, follows:

- Looking Outward: A New Trade Strategy for Canada (a research report), 1975, https://publications.gc.ca/collections/collection_2018/ecc/EC22-27-1975-eng.pdf This is an appraisal of Canada's commercial strategy with respect to living standards, unemployment, price stability, income distribution, and economic growth.
- Efficiency and Regulation: A Study of Deposit Institutions (a research report), 1976 https://publications.gc.ca/collections/collection_2018/ecc/EC22-47-1976-eng.pdf The report examined the environment in which deposit institutions were operating and analysed their performance, in order to assess the nature and extent of the obstacles hindering financial market efficiency.
- People and Jobs: A Study of the Canadian Labour Market (a research report), 1976 https://publications.gc.ca/collections/collection_2018/ecc/EC22-42-1976-eng.pdf This is a comprehensive study of the workings of the Canadian labour market, including an appraisal of unemployment wages, job search, and labour market programs.
- Living Together: A Study of Regional Disparities (a research report), 1977 https://publications.gc.ca/collections/collection_2018/ecc/EC22-54-1977-eng.pdf This report presents the results of research into the causes of regional problems, with a view to widening understanding of them sufficiently to suggest some new directions in policy-making.
- For a Common Future: A Study of Canada's Relations with Developing Countries (a research report), 1977 https://publications.gc.ca/collections/collection_2018/ecc/EC22-5-1978-eng.pdf This report is not primarily concerned with Canadian "positions" on multilateral negotiations about the international economic order. Rather, it is a re-evaluation of Canada's policies towards the developing world as they occur through trade, investment, aid, and migration links.
- One in Three: Pensions for Canadians to 2030 (a research report), 1979 https://publications.gc.ca/collections/collection_2018/ecc/EC22-69-1979-eng.pdf This study was focused on the question of whether or not the older generation will have adequate income without risk to the economy.
- Economic Policy Options: a technical analysis (a statement), 1981 https://publications.gc.ca/collections/collection_2019/ecc/EC27-14-1981-eng.pdf This statement offered the federal government some pre-budget advice for economic policy formulation basis in the form of the results of the analysis of prospective economic problems confronting Canada over the 1980s.
- In Short Supply: Jobs and Skills in the 1980s (a research report), 1982 https://publications.gc.ca/collections/collection_2018/ecc/EC22-108-1982-eng.pdf This report deals with the way the labour market works and with measures that might be taken when it does not to improve its allocative efficiency.
- Intervention and Efficiency: A Study of Government Credit and Credit Guarantees to the Private Sector (a research report), 1982 https://publications.gc.ca/collections/collection_2018/ecc/EC22-111-1982-eng.pdf This study focuses on government intervention aimed at assisting the private sector through financial instruments - loans, investments, guarantees, and credit insurance, focusing on the business, agriculture, housing, and export sectors.
- The Bottom Line: Technology, Trade, and Income Growth (a research report), 1983 https://publications.gc.ca/collections/collection_2018/ecc/EC22-113-1983-eng.pdf The report deals with the threat posed by the productivity slowdown with respect to future growth in living standards and with the potential contribution that increased trade can make to such growth.
- Western Transition (a research report), 1984 https://publications.gc.ca/collections/collection_2018/ecc/EC22-123-1984-eng.pdf Concern had been expressed about the bias of the western economic structures towards resources and away from the manufacturing industry and that, as a result, fewer "good jobs" would exist and that income would be distributed less equitably than elsewhere. In this report the long-term economic prospects for the western provinces of Canada were examined. Future growth will likely be strong absolutely and reasonable compared with that in the rest of Canada, though weak compared with the headier boom times of the 1970s.
- Connections: An Energy Strategy for the Future (a research report), 1985 https://publications.gc.ca/collections/collection_2018/ecc/EC22-124-1985-eng.pdf This was a study of the supply of all forms of energy in Canada that attempted to examine and reconcile differences among regions and individuals in order to articulate a new energy strategy designed to increase benefits for all Canadians.
- Competition and Solvency: A Framework for Financial Regulation (a statement), 1986 https://publications.gc.ca/collections/collection_2018/ecc/EC22-134-1986-eng.pdf This report contains a synthesis of the extensive factual study and analysis undertaken to provide a basis for the 31 proposals for strengthening the Canadian financial system that have been formulated by the council.
- Minding the Public's Business (a research report), 1986 https://publications.gc.ca/collections/collection_2018/ecc/EC22-135-1986-eng.pdf This study drew on evidence from various sectors to develop an understanding of the features of public enterprise and of the roles for which it was reasonable to employ this public policy instrument. It also analysed, from the perspective of the firm, the issues of accountability and control by attempting to explore the links between the question of control and the role which public enterprises are expected to fulfil.
- Innovation and Jobs in Canada, 1987 (2 publications): The study was designed to contribute to the policy debate as to how labour market adjustment to rapid technological change can be achieved both equitably and efficiently.
  - Innovation and Jobs in Canada (research report): https://publications.gc.ca/collections/collection_2018/ecc/EC22-141-1987-eng.pdf
  - Making technology work: innovation and jobs in Canada (a statement): https://publications.gc.ca/collections/collection_2018/ecc/EC22-142-1987-eng.pdf
- Venturing Forth: An Assessment of the Canada-U.S. Trade Agreement (a statement), 1988 https://publications.gc.ca/collections/collection_2018/ecc/EC22-151-1988-eng.pdf In this study, the recently (1988) signed Free-Trade Agreement between Canada and US was examined with respect to the projected medium- and long-term of reduced trade barriers on the performance of the Canadian economy, specifically on incomes, output and productivity.
- From the Bottom Up: The Community Economic-Development Approach (a statement), 1990 https://publications.gc.ca/collections/collection_2019/ecc/EC22-170-1990-eng.pdf The purpose of the project was to examine the potential for using community programs and entrepreneurship as tools for economic and business development to deal with the continuing problem of economic stagnation in many regions of the country. Note that a series of papers written for this project can be found here: https://publications.gc.ca/site/eng/9.855500/publication.html
  - "Local Development Papers": https://publications.gc.ca/site/eng/9.855500/publication.html;
- Employment in the Service Economy, 199o-1992 (2 publications): This research was concerned with the growth and changes in service industries, their growing linkages to the goods sector, and the trends that are redefining the labour market as employment becomes increasingly concentrated in services. Also examined are the problems certain groups are experiencing in adjusting to the changing industrial structure, the proliferation of nonstandard jobs, the growth of work with high skill content, the increasing importance of training and education, and the polarization of earnings.
  - Good Jobs, Bad Jobs: Employment in the Service Economy (a statement), 1990 https://www.publications.gc.ca/site/eng/9.868830/publication.html
  - Employment in the Service Economy (a research report), by Gordon Betcherman et al., 1991 https://www.publications.gc.ca/site/eng/9.868901/publication.html
- Economic and Social Impacts of Immigration (2 publications): The focus in this study was on the social, political and humanitarian effects of immigration as well how well immigrants do in Canada, addressing issues of tolerance, prejudice and diversity, as well the processing of refugees and the distribution of immigrants among the provinces and territories.
  - New Faces in the Crowd: Economic and Social Impacts of Immigration (a statement), 1991 https://publications.gc.ca/collections/collection_2019/ecc/EC22-171-1991-eng.pdf
  - Economic and Social Impacts of immigration (a research report), 1992 https://publications.gc.ca/collections/collection_2019/ecc/EC22-176-1991-eng.pdf
- A Lot to Learn: Education and Training in Canada (a statement), 1992 https://publications.gc.ca/collections/collection_2019/ecc/EC22-182-1992-eng.pdf This report examined how primary and secondary schools and the training system in Canada prepared young people for employment; identified weaknesses in the overall system; and suggested new target and policy directions that will help make education and training more effective and responsive to the needs of Canadians.
- The New Face of Poverty: Income Security Needs of Canadian Families (a research report), 1992 https://archive.org/details/newfaceofpoverty0000unse/mode/2up (need free membership to Archives Canada to view this).This study provided insights into poverty in Canada by tracking the incomes of families over a five-year period, addressing such issues as poverty income level, work skills and attachment to the labour market, and dependence on and efficiency of income support.
- Pulling Together: Productivity, Innovation, and Trade (a statement), 1992 https://publications.gc.ca/collections/collection_2019/ecc/EC22-180-1992-eng.pdf This is a summary of the main findings of the council's research on productivity, costs, innovation, and trade. It explored why Canadian industry had performed poorly over the previous years relative to its trading partners and described the feedback between the micro world of management and labour and the macro world of inflation and exchange rates.

=== Reference reports ===
Some of the Council research work was referred to it by government (at the federal and/or provincial level) or external stakeholders, which typically provided some financial and human resources assistance. The council was considered an appropriate organization to undertake such Reference studies because it had the skills and experience in forming and leading economic research teams and sought consensus for its major studies. Over the life of the council, the topics covered by Reference Reports comprise the following: factors affecting prices, costs, productivity and incomes in the context of sustained economic growth; consumer protection policies, combines and mergers, and intellectual property (three separate reports); construction cyclicality; the Newfoundland economy; inflation (by the Centre for the Study of Inflation and Productivity, an agency of the council; economic regulation; and the Prairies grain economy]. In addition, three references begun towards the end of the council's life were completed after it closed under the auspices of two universities, Queen's University and University of Ottawa, participating in a temporary organization (Queen's-University of Ottawa Economic Projects. This work covered governance; human resources management; and the cost effectiveness of health care. A list and short descriptions of the Reference studies, along with the Reference Report titles, follow:

"Incomes Policy"

In 1965, the federal government asked the council to conduct a broad examination of prices, costs, incomes and productivity, and their relationships to sustained economic growth, rising living standards, and high levels of employment and trade. This was essentially a study of "incomes policy" for Canada. The council was also asked to examine the experience and programs of other countries in this area.

Prices, Productivity and Employment, Third Annual Review, Chapters 3, 4 and 5 https://publications.gc.ca/collections/collection_2018/ecc/EC21-1-1966-eng.pdf

Consumer protection policies, combines and mergers, and intellectual property

In 1966, the federal government requested that the council study and advise it on important aspects of responsibility of the Department of the Registrar General of Canada: (1) the interests of the consumer relating to the functions of the Department of the Registrar General (consumer affairs/protection); (2) combines, mergers, monopolies and restraint of trade (competition policy); and (3) patents, trademarks, copyrights and registered industrial designs (intellectual property). The study was conducted and reported on in three parts, corresponding to the three subjects of enquiry:

- Interim Report to Consumer Affairs and the Department of the Registrar General, 1967 https://publications.gc.ca/collections/collection_2019/ecc/EC22-1067-eng.pdf
- Interim Report on Competition Policy, 1969 https://publications.gc.ca/collections/collection_2018/ecc/EC22-12-1969-eng.pdf
- Report on Intellectual and Industrial Property, 1971 https://publications.gc.ca/collections/collection_2019/ecc/EC22-1370-1971-eng.pdf

Construction cyclicality

In 1972, the prime minister asked to the council to study the causes and effects of cyclical instability in construction, with a view to making recommendations on how to reduce it. The final report released in 1974 is a study of the innate instability of the construction industry and its impacts on major industries and regions.

Toward More Stable Growth in Construction: Report of the Study on Cyclical Instability in Construction, 1974 https://publications.gc.ca/collections/collection_2019/ecc/EC22-2174-1973-eng.pdf

Newfoundland economy

In 1978, the prime minister directed the council to carry out a special study of economic development problems and opportunities in Newfoundland, including an assessment of the relationship between its persistent high unemployment and low economic performance, as well as an analysis of alternative means of reducing unemployment, raising earned incomes, reducing its dependence on transfers, and assisting to plan its medium-term development strategy. The final report was released in 1980.

Newfoundland: from Dependency to Self-reliance, 1980 https://publications.gc.ca/collections/collection_2018/ecc/EC22-85-1980-eng.pdf

Inflation

In 1978, following a request by the prime minister and provincial premiers, the Centre for the Study of Inflation and Productivity (CSIP) was established as an agency of the council to analyze price and cost developments subsequent to the termination of mandatory controls on prices and incomes in that year. The final report was published in 1980.

Final Report of the Centre for the Study of Inflation and Productivity, 1980 https://publications.gc.ca/collections/collection_2018/ecc/EC22-83-1980-eng.pdf

Economic regulation

In 1978, the prime minister and a few provincial governments asked the council to conduct a study of economic regulation at all levels of government and to provide, in consultation with the provinces and the private sector, recommendations for action. The report sets out the results of analyse of the assortment of economic regulations that confronted Canadians, including a history of regulation in Canada, regulatory factors affecting competitiveness, regulation in particular markets like transportation and fishing, health, safety and occupational regulations. A preliminary report was released in 1978, an interim report, in 1979, and the final report in 1981, along with technical reports and discussion papers.

- Reforming Regulation, 1981: https://publications.gc.ca/collections/collection_2018/ecc/EC22-93-1981-eng.pdf
- Interim Report: Responsible Regulation: https://publications.gc.ca/site/archivee-archived.html?url=https://publications.gc.ca/collections/collection_2018/ecc/EC22-70-1979-eng.pdf
- Technical Reports: https://publications.gc.ca/site/eng/9.855538/issues.html
- Discussion Papers: https://publications.gc.ca/site/eng/9.855540/issues.html

Prairie grain economy

In 1986, the Premier of Saskatchewan asked the Council to undertake a study of the Prairie grain economy which was being "besieged" by a turbulent international market and Canadian agricultural policies. The prime minister supported the collaboration, and funding was provided by the provinces of Alberta and Saskatchewan, the federal Department of Agriculture, and three private sector organizations. The research focused on two dimensions of the Prairie grain economy: the turbulent international market on which most Prairie crops are sold, and the response of Canadian agricultural policies and Prairie farmers to that turbulent marketplace. The underlying message of the work was that Prairie grain production, while internationally competitive, became a riskier business than it had been.

Handling the Risks: A Report on the Prairie Grain Economy, 1988 https://publications.gc.ca/site/eng/9.866354/publication.html

Governance

This began at the council following a request from the prime minister to undertake a study of how government could perform its own tasks more efficiently and effectively. The final report was completed at and published by Queen's University's School of Policy Studies.

Searching for Good Governance: Government and Competitiveness Project final report, by Bryne Purchase and Ron Hirschhorn, School of Policy Studies, Queen's University, 1993 https://openlibrary.org/books/OL22112718M/Searching_for_good_governance#reader-observations

Human resources management

The federal government departments of Industry Canada and Human Resources Development Canada asked, and provided funding for, the council to study human resource management practices, which were rapidly changing in the late 1980s. The final report was published by the Industrial Relations Centre of Queen's University, along with a number of other papers in the Human Resources Management Project Series.

The Canadian Workplace in Transition, Final Report of the Human Resource Management Project, by Gordon Betcherman, Kathryn McMullen, Norm Leckie, and Christina Caron, Industrial Relations Centre, Queen's University at Kingston, 1994. https://archive.org/details/canadianworkplac0000betc

Cost-effectiveness of health care

This study was requested by the federal government. It was moved to UOttawa with active support from three provincial governments (British Columbia, Ontario and Saskatchewan) along with 13 public and private organizations. The final synthesis report was published in 1995, along with 18 working papers. A review article by Judith Maxwell and Terry Albert was published on the Europe PMC website: https://europepmc.org/article/MED/10140965

Sustainable Health Care for Canada: Sustainable Health Care for Canada: Final synthesis report, by Angus, Douglas, Ludwig Auer, J. Eden Cloutier and Terry Albert, Queen's–University of Ottawa Economic Projects, Ottawa, 1995 https://bac-lac.on.worldcat.org/search?queryString=no:35910247

=== Conferences, Workshops and Colloquia ===
Reflecting the council's mandated consultation role, a large part of its activity was, sometimes sponsoring in partnership with other organizations to convene government and academic researchers, conferences, colloquia, and workshops. Short descriptions of the gatherings, along with the title of corresponding reports. follow

National Conference on Labour-Management Relations, Ottawa, Canada, 9–10 November, 964

(4 major papers + commentaries): https://publications.gc.ca/collections/collection_2019/ecc/EC22-364-1965-eng.pdf

The National Conference coincided with increasing awareness of the complex and pervasive change under way in the economic and social circumstances of Canada and other countries during the 1960s. The great challenge of this change is to recognize the significance of the new developments and grasp the rising opportunities they offer, while dealing effectivelyand equitably with the social and human problems involved

Conference on Productivity through New Technology, Winnipeg, MB, 1966, co-sponsored by the Manitoba Economic Consultative Board

(no summary – 7 papers only): https://publications.gc.ca/site/eng/9.855494/publication.html

The purpose of the Conference was to inform senior executives of small- and medium-sized businesses about the practical application of the new management, production and handling concepts, techniques and tools available to them at the time, including the use of computers and automatic production equipment.

Conference on International Trade and Canadian Agriculture, Banff, Alberta, January 10–12, 1966, co-sponsored by the Agricultural Economics Research Council of Canada

(8 papers plus conference statement): https://publications.gc.ca/collections/collection_2019/ecc/EC22-766-1966-eng.pdf

The objectives of the Conference included: the preparation of a set of authoritative studies, the examination of the problems and issues by invited representative leaders and professionals of farm organizations, industry, labour, the economics profession, government officials and consumers, the preparation of a Conference statement setting out the main findings, and the publication of an objective assessment of the Conference discussions.

Conference on Stabilization Policies, London, ON, August 30 to September 1, 1965, co-sponsored by University of Western Ontario

(5 papers, no summary): https://publications.gc.ca/collections/collection_2019/ecc/EC22-665-1966-eng.pdf

In the 1960s, there was increasing development of new information on the extent and timing of responses to policy changes, in the main categories of expenditures in the economy, making possible new empirical work on questions relating to stabilization policies. The purpose of the Conference was to summarize this work, facilitate understanding and discussion of the results, and lay the basis for future work.

National Conference on Labour-Management Relations, Ottawa, Canada, March 21–22, 1967

(6 papers + summary): https://publications.gc.ca/collections/collection_2019/ecc/EC22-367-1967-eng.pdf

The Conference was asked in particular to focus its attention on two important problem areas in the field of labour-management relations in Canada in the 1960s: how to deal effectively and equitably with manpower adjustment problems arising from technological and other change; how to improve communications so as to get a better exchange of information and views both between and within labour and management

Conference on Government Information Systems, 1967

(8 papers + summary of panel discussion): https://archive.org/details/conferenceongove0000conf (need be to National Library and Archives Canada member (free) to view it)

The main purpose of this conference was to clarify the basic concept, problems and potential of government information systems to describe some of the systems in operation at the time.

Workshop Seminar on the Political Economy of Canadian Education, Montebello, Québec,1971.

Canadian Higher Education in the Seventies, Sylvia Ostry (Editor), 1972 (9 papers): https://archive.org/details/canadianhighered0000work (need be to National Library and Archives member (free) to view it)

The purpose for the seminar was to initiate a dialogue between education policy makers and the research community whose function was to analyse the need for and results of those policies. Issues addressed included the demand for higher education, educational planning, occupational wage differentials and licencing, vocational and continuing education, and educational financing.

National Economic Conferences (two), 1973 and 1974

- The Outlook from 1973, Montreal, December 12–14, 1973 (report, 1974): https://publications.gc.ca/site/eng/9.862545/publication.html
- Priorities in Transition, Montreal, December 1–3, 1974 (proceedings and summary of 16 papers, 1975): https://publications.gc.ca/collections/collection_2018/ecc/EC21-4-1974-eng.pdf

This Conference was to be an institution whose main objective was to facilitate decision-making on basic Canadian economic issues. It was to pursue this end mainly through annual conferences in which business and labour leaders, and representatives of consumer and other interests, could seek a consensus on national goals and priorities, and on recommendations for government and industry policies and programs. Only two such conferences were held, however.

Conference on Industrial Adaptation, June 26–28, 1977

(proceedings, 1978 and summary of 7 papers): https://publications.gc.ca/collections/collection_2018/ecc/EC22-57-1978-1.pdf

The focus of this conference was on the major sources of change to which Canadian manufacturing industry may have to adapt in the coming decade (1980s), such as technological change, shifts in demand and tastes, and political and social factors. Major emphasis was placed on the implications of the rapid emergence of Third World competitors and on identification of the Canadian industries, regions, and groups likely to be most affected.

Workshop on the Political Economy of Confederation, Kingston, ON, November 8–10, 1978, co-sponsored by The Institute of Intergovernmental Relations

(Proceedings, 1979; 12 papers): https://publications.gc.ca/collections/collection_2018/ecc/EC22-66-1979-eng.pdf

Following the election of the separatist Parti Quebecois government in Quebec in 1977, this workshop was convened to contribute economic data and information to the debate on separation and confederation.

Conference on Canadian Incomes, Winnipeg, Manitoba, May 10–12, 1979

Reflections on Canadian Incomes: a collection of papers, 1980 (summary of 27 papers): https://publications.gc.ca/collections/collection_2018/ecc/EC22-78-1980-eng.pdf

The purposes of the Conference were threefold: to assess the current levels of knowledge and directions of activity in incomes research in Canada, to indicate some of the policy implications that derived from this knowledge, and to suggest in what directions future research efforts should be directed. The presence of invited foreign colleagues gave additional scope and depth to the deliberations on these points.

Conference on Inflation-Induced Distortions in Financial Reporting, Toronto, Oct 15–16, 1981

Peering under the Inflationary Veil: Proceedings of a Conference on Inflation-Induced Distortions in Financial Reporting and Taxation, 1982, summary edited by Patrick Grady; 6 papers + synopsis): https://publications.gc.ca/collections/collection_2018/ecc/EC22-106-1982-eng.pdf

The purpose was to examine the threat of inflation at the time which was seen as chronic and creating great problems for the rules of financial reporting, especially those based on historical costs. These pressures were said to be negatively affecting sound decision making in all sectors of the economy.

Colloquium on the Economic Status of Women in the Labour Market, Montreal, QC, November 26–28, 1984

Towards Equity: Proceedings of a Colloquium on the Economic Status of Women in the Labour Market, 1985; 10 papers + summary) https://publications.gc.ca/collections/collection_2018/ecc/EC22-126-1985-eng.pdf

The objectives of this conference were to describe the main aspects of the changing participation of women in the labour market in the 1980s; to identify those occupations where women have made the greatest and the least progress; to analyse the conditions that led to such gains and losses; and to propose, on the basis of the results, measures and policies to promote equal economic opportunity for women.

Colloquium on Government Enterprise, Ottawa, September 24, 25, 1984

Government Enterprise: Roles and Rationales, Papers presented at a Colloquium; introduction by Ron Hirschhorn; 10 papers plus summary); https://publications.gc.ca/collections/collection_2019/ecc/EC22-371-1984-eng.pdf

For the colloquium, as for the council project, interest was centred on organizations with a particular set of characteristics: the relevant actors were owned or controlled by a government, they had separate legal status along with a reasonable degree of operating autonomy, and they were all engaged to a significant extent in what might broadly be considered as commercial activities.

Colloquium on the Environment, Toronto, December 1985

Managing the Legacy: Proceedings of a Colloquium on the Environment, 1986; 8 papers. https://publications.gc.ca/collections/collection_2018/ecc/EC22-131-1986-eng.pdf

The papers attempted to address such questions as: how global environmental concerns relate to people in various parts of Canada; how resource exploitation could be made more compatible with renewal; how to achieve the proper allocation of responsibility in a society using a plethora of toxic substances; and how economic analyses and decision making could better incorporate environmental values.

Colloquium on Health Care, Winnipeg, May 1986

Aging with Limited Health Resources: Proceedings of a Colloquium on Health Care, 1987; 8 papers: https://publications.gc.ca/collections/collection_2018/ecc/EC22-139-1987-eng.pdf

The focus of the colloquium was on how the health system should be redesigned to modify the underlying incentive structure and the basic objectives of the system, addressing such issues health maintenance, impact of advances in medical technology, and patient and morbidity-related accounting systems.

Perspective 2000, Ottawa, November 30 and December 1, 1988

- Proceedings of Perspective 2000, edited by K. Newton, T. Schweitzer, and J.-P. Voyer, 1990; 12 papers) https://publications.gc.ca/collections/collection_2019/ecc/EC22-167-1990-eng.pdf
- Perspective 2000 Synopsis, 1990, by K. Newton and J.-P. Voyer, rapporteurs https://publications.gc.ca/collections/collection_2019/ecc/EC22-168-1990-eng.pdf

The council had two objectives for this conference: to create an intellectually stimulating event for the participants; and to create a background against which we could develop our research agenda for the 1990s. This, in turn, would help the council address its responsibility to provide Canadians with pertinent and forward-looking advice on how to improve the country's economic performance. The accelerating pace of change in the world economy and the growing interaction among different disciplines made it essential for the council to use a wider canvas than economics in selecting future research topics.

=== Research Monographs ===
A major aspect of the council output was individually authored monographs. These included, in addition to the papers published as part of the final Conference reports, papers and reports penned by one or more individual researchers employed by the council or commissioned by it, typically working on research projects or on Annual Reviews. These vehicles were released as stand-alones or under different series, as follows:

- a large number of major individually authored research reports often associated with one of the council's major research or reference study reports cited above;
- 31 "Staff Studies", 1964–1971, associated with first 8 Annual Reviews: https://publications.gc.ca/site/eng/9.855513/issues.html?rq.ssp=6&psi=1&hpp=10 ;
- 25 "Special Studies", 1965–1973, more extensive studies: https://publications.gc.ca/site/eng/9.855502/issues.html ;
- 26 "Technical Reports", 1981, associated with the Regulation reference: https://publications.gc.ca/site/eng/9.855538/issues.html ;
- 17 "Local Development Papers", 1989–90, discussion papers for the community economic development study: https://publications.gc.ca/site/eng/9.855500/publication.html; and
- 468 "general" Discussion Papers and Working Papers, 1972-1990: https://www.publications.gc.ca/site/eng/9.855540/issues.html

Examples of topics covered by the reports and reports follow:

Year	Topics of Individually-Authored Monographs (excl. discussion & working papers)
1970	International corporations
1971	Business education at universities; Economic consultative bodies; Managerial human resource needs; Intellectual/industrial property
1972	Higher education;
1973	Taxation
1974	Industrial strategy; Social indicators
1975	Employment insecurity and industrial relations in construction; Construction instability
1976	Canada-US automotive agreement; impacts of labour market programs; Euro-currency and Canadian banks; Income maintenance programs
1977	
1978	Canadian industry and developing countries; Correspondence of urban systems and economic base in regions; Industrial adjustment
1979	Elderly income maintenance abroad; Innovation diffusion; Banking rates of return; Regional differences in productivity and tariff impacts
1980	Labour turnover; minimum wage; labour market skills and shortages; frictional unemployment; language earnings disparities; population and labour force projections; Trade relations with developing countries; Taxation and SME financing; Future pension financing; intergenerational pension study; CPI; wage inflation
1981	Computer technology in service sector; Pollution compensation; Farm incomes
1982	R&D expenditures by country; Choice of governing instrument; Regulation in agriculture; Government loan guarantees Meeting skill needs (survey report)
1983	Productivity growth; Export financing assistance Investment assistance Hydro-electricity rents
1984	Govt loan subsidies; govt enterprise; innovation subsidization; Female economic status; female labour force participation
1985	Employment and tech change; labour markets Regulation and drug research and development
1986	Oil and natural gas reserves Female re-entrants into labour force Emerging technologies; technology and the labour market
1987	Atomic Energy of Canada Ltd Hospital costs and productivity Capital income taxation; tax reform Workplace innovation
1988	Employment effects of tax credit program Taxation and savings Petro Canada
1989	Canada and international grain markets; agricultural policy; prairie grain outlook; Regulation and natural monopolies; Trade liberalization
1990	Manufacturing adjustment to trade Structural change and adjustment; Human resource management
1991	Unemployment Corporate mergers and acquisitions Full employment Income maintenance (Mincome experiment)
1992	Use of advanced technologies; Productivity Public sector Constitutional division of powers Drug expenditures Earnings of immigrants R&D and productivity growth

=== Dissemination ===
Finally, an important aspect of the council's mandate was to disseminate the knowledge gained through its research. In the early years, this was carried out by the release of the report and accompanying press releases, along with speeches and conference presentations. Then, in 1976, the council introduced the quarterly Bulletin to summarize and publicize Council products and activities; about 16 Bulletins were released. In 1980, this series was replaced by another quarterly, Au courant. At one point in the early 1980s, Au Courant had a distribution of some 38,000. Its last issue was released in 1992, where the closing of the council was announced and its last few publications highlighted.
