= Isabel Bassett =

Canadian broadcaster and politician

The Honourable Isabel Bassett CM OOnt ECO

Member of the Ontario Provincial Parliament for St. Andrew—St. Patrick
- In office 1995–1999
- Preceded by: Zanana Akande
- Succeeded by: Riding abolished

Personal details
- Born: Isabel Glenthorne Macdonald; August 23, 1939 (age 86) Halifax, Nova Scotia
- Party: Progressive Conservative
- Spouse(s): John W. H. Bassett (1967—1998, his death)
- Domestic partner: Ernie Eves (1999-)
- Occupation: Teacher, journalist

Isabel Bassett CM OOnt (born August 23, 1939) is a Canadian broadcaster and former politician. From 1999 until 2005 she was the chair and CEO of TVOntario/TFO, Ontario's provincial public television network. She has been a controversial figure at times, but is also a highly regarded pioneer in Canadian broadcasting.

== Background ==
Bassett was born Isabel Glenthorne Macdonald in Halifax, Nova Scotia. She received a Bachelor of Arts from Queen's University and a Master of Arts from York University in 1973. As well, she graduated from teacher's college and taught English and French at Humberside Collegiate Institute.

Bassett first entered Canadian public life as a journalist for the Toronto Telegram in the 1960s. She later joined CTV, where she became a prominent reporter and documentary producer, including a stint with W5, after marrying Baton Broadcasting owner John W. H. Bassett on July 17, 1967. Although her documentary work for CTV won numerous awards, she was sometimes accused of having been given her position solely because she was married to the owner. John Bassett died in 1998, and Isabel subsequently began a relationship with cabinet colleague Ernie Eves. Bassett has also written a number of books on the political, social and historical achievements of Canadian women.

== Politics ==
In the federal election of 1993, Bassett ran as a Progressive Conservative candidate in the Toronto riding of St. Paul's. She lost to Liberal Barry Campbell by over 15,000 votes.

Bassett was elected in the provincial election of 1995, defeating Liberal candidate Carolyn Bennett (later a federal Member of Parliament) by about 3,500 votes. She served as the Progressive Conservative Member of Provincial Parliament (MPP) for St. Andrew—St. Patrick for the next four years. On October 10, 1997, she was appointed Minister of Citizenship, Culture and Recreation in the government of Mike Harris. Despite the Harris government's right-wing reputation, Bassett is a Red Tory, and was one of the most socially progressive members of the Harris cabinet.

In the 1999 provincial election, Bassett was defeated in the new provincial riding of St. Paul's by Liberal candidate Michael Bryant. She was one of several Toronto Progressive Conservatives defeated in the city due to the unpopularity of Harris' government.

=== Cabinet positions ===
Harris ministry, Province of Ontario (1995–2002)
Cabinet post (1)
Predecessor	Office	Successor
Marilyn Mushinski	Minister of Citizenship, Culture and Recreation; 1997-1999	Helen Johns

== TVOntario ==
After the election, Bassett was appointed as head of TVOntario by Mike Harris. Her mandate was to refocus the network on educational programming; however, Bassett successfully found ways to ensure that the network's most popular non-educational programs, such as Saturday Night at the Movies and Studio 2, could continue to air.

Bassett's position again became controversial when Eves became Premier of Ontario in 2002, with media critics noting the potential conflict of interest inherent in Bassett remaining as head of TVOntario while simultaneously in a common law relationship with the provincial premier. However, Bassett was popular within TVOntario, and the controversy soon subsided. She remained chair and CEO of TVOntario until September 29, 2005, when the Liberal government of Dalton McGuinty separated the two positions. Bassett's successors were film producer Peter O'Brian as chair, and former Astral Media executive Lisa de Wilde as CEO.

== Honours ==
In 2016, she was made a member of the Order of Ontario.

On June 30, 2016, Bassett was made a Member of the Order of Canada for "her community engagement and commitment to the advancement of women and public service, notably in educational broadcasting."

Preceded by Peter Herrndorf	Chair and CEO of TVOntario; 1999-2005	Succeeded by Peter O'Brian as Chair and Lisa de Wilde as CEO
