= Jim Parr =

Jim Parr FRSC, P.Eng., LLD (Hon)
- Born: James Gordon Parr; May 26, 1927; Peterborough, England
- Died: April 5, 2000 (aged 72)
- Education: University of Leeds (BSc); University of Liverpool (PhD)
- Occupations: metallurgist, broadcaster, academic, civil servant

Director-General, Ontario Science Centre
- In office 1985–1988

Chairman and CEO, TVOntario
- In office 1979–1985

Deputy Minister, Colleges and Universities Ontario
- In office 1973–1979

Chairman, Committee on University Affairs Ontario
- In office 1972–1973

Dean of the Faculty of Applied Science Professor of Engineering Science University of Windsor
- In office 1964–1972

Professor of Metallurgy University of Alberta
- In office 1955–1964

James Gordon Parr (May 26, 1927 – April 5, 2000) was an English-Canadian academic, broadcaster and provincial civil servant in the province of Ontario, Canada.

Parr was an engineer by training specializing in metallurgy and he once hosted a programme on CBC Radio called The Mad Metallurgist aimed at popularizing the discipline. He also wrote several books on the subject, including The Engineer's Guide to Steel; Man, Metals and Modern Magic and An Introduction to Stainless Steel.

== Education and early career ==
Born and raised in Peterborough, England, Parr received his early education at Woodston junior primary school and Deacon's School, where his father was games master. He passed his School Certificate at the age of 13 and his Higher School Certificate at 16.

In 1947, Parr graduated from the University of Leeds with a BSc in metallurgy and spent three months in Canada working for Inco in Copper Cliff, Ontario, on a Nuffield Foundation Travel Scholarship. At the age of 21 he became a lecturer at the University of Liverpool, where he studied for his doctorate. In 1951, a Nuffield Post-Graduate Scholarship brought him back to Canada for four months to visit mines, refineries and university departments of metallurgy.

After finishing his doctorate in Liverpool in 1953 he returned to Canada, this time permanently, to work for the British Columbia Research Council.

== Academic career ==
While working at the research council, Parr lectured at the University of British Columbia. Starting in 1955, he was associate professor and then full professor at the University of Alberta. He moved to Windsor, Ontario in 1964 to become professor of engineering science and dean of the faculty of applied science (later renamed the faculty of engineering) at the University of Windsor. He was also president of the university's Industrial Research Institute.

By 1970 he had published around seventy technical papers and was elected a fellow of the Royal Society of Canada, which noted "his outstanding research on titanium and zirconium alloys, martensite transformations and contributions to corrosion engineering."

== Civil service and later career ==
After serving as chairman of the Commission on Post-Secondary Education in Ontario (COPSEO) and as chairman of the Ontario Committee on University Affairs in 1972, Parr was appointed deputy minister of Colleges and Universities in 1973—a civil service position for the provincial government.

In 1979, he was appointed chairman and chief executive officer of TVOntario during which time he unsuccessfully sought a license for the network from the Canadian Radio-television and Telecommunications Commission (CRTC) to launch a national children's channel. Under his tenure at TVO, the on-air membership drive was initiated, the first co-production deal with Japan's NHK was negotiated, and the groundwork was laid for TVO's French-language network.

In 1985, Parr was appointed director-general of the Ontario Science Centre for a three-year term, in the course of which the centre experienced renewed enthusiasm, increased attendance, and larger grants.

Parr received an honorary Doctor of Laws degree from the University of Windsor in 1984.

== Other pursuits ==
In addition to photography and writing poetry, Parr composed selections for the piano and wrote operettas that were performed at the Arts and Letters Club of Toronto, where he served as president from 1982 to 1984.

Two years before his untimely death, Parr produced a CD, "When Music Sounds", consisting solely of his own songs, sung by Canadian tenor James Leatch accompanied by pianist Dona Jean Clary.

== Books ==
- Man, Metals and Modern Magic. American Society for Metals. 1958.
- The Engineer's Guide to Steel with Albert Hanson. Addison-Wesley. 1965.
- An Introduction to Stainless Steel with Albert Hanson. American Society for Metals. 1965.
- Any Other Business?: How to be a good committee person. Clarke, Irwin. 1977.
- Is There Anybody There?: Verse. Quetico Press, Atikokan. 1979.
- Stainless Steel with R.A.Lula. American Society for Metals. 1986.
- Essays. Lugus. 1991.
- Introduction to Stainless Steels with Jonathan Beddoes. ASM International. 1999.

== Awards and Honours ==
- Canadian Centennial Medal, 1967
- Queen Elizabeth II Silver Jubilee Medal, 1977
- Citizenship Award, Association of Professional Engineers of Ontario, 1983
- LLD (Hon), University of Windsor, 1984
- Fellow, American Society for Metals
- Fellow, Ryerson Polytechnical Institute
- Fellow, Ontario Institute for Studies in Education

== General References ==
- Simpson, Kieran, ed. (1993). Canadian Who's Who (XXVIII ed.). University of Toronto Press. p. 863.
- American Men & Women of Science (21st ed.). Detroit: Thomson/Gale. 2003. p. 873.
- Strong, Joanne (February 12, 1983). "The Informal James Gordon Parr". The Globe and Mail. p. 18.
- "worldcat". worldcat.org.

Cultural offices
Preceded by J. Tuzo Wilson	Director-General of the Ontario Science Centre; 1985–1988	Succeeded by Mark Abbott
Preceded by Thomas "Ran" Ide	Chairman and Chief Executive Officer of TVOntario; 1979-1985	Succeeded by John Radford
Government offices
Preceded by H.H.Walker	Deputy Minister of Colleges and Universities; Ontario; 1973–1979	Succeeded by Harry K. Fisher
Educational offices
Preceded by Douglas Tyndall Wright	Chairman of the Committee on University Affairs; Ontario; 1972–1973	Succeeded by Reva Gerstein
Academic offices
Preceded by Frank A. DeMarco	Dean of the Faculty of Applied Science; University of Windsor; 1964–1972	Succeeded by Laurie Kennedy as Dean of Engineering
Other offices
Preceded by Norman McMurrich	President; Arts and Letters Club of Toronto; 1982–1984	Succeeded by Ken Jarvis
