= Independent Learning Centre =

- Canada

Information
- School type: Online High School / Homeschool / Distance Education
- Motto: Ontario's Designated Provider of Distance Education
- Founded: 1926
- Grades: 9 to 12 (Secondary)
- Enrollment: 22,000 (2014 approx.)
- Language: English; French
- Campus: Ontario
- Website: www.ilc.org

Independent Learning Centre, branded as TVO ILC, is an online public secular high school in the Canadian province of Ontario. TVO ILC has a mandate from the Ontario Ministry of Education as the designated provider of province-wide distance education to offer: an alternative source of public education in English and French; services that are complementary and equivalent to public school boards such as delivering credit courses, providing student support and granting the Ontario Secondary School Diploma (OSSD), technology-enhanced education using new media to deliver online learning resources and facilitate student support in a blended learning format.

It is the exclusive provider of Canadian Adult Education Credential (CAEC) high school equivalency testing in Ontario, and was the province's provider of General Educational Development (GED) testing before that program was discontinued in Canada in 2024.

== History and origins ==
The ILC was founded in 1926 when Ontario's Department of Education established correspondence courses for elementary school children living in isolated communities in northern Ontario. A "Railway School Car Program" serving children in isolated areas but along railway lines was also established that year. "the teacher and his family lived on the train car, which was part of CP Rail... They went from stop to stop, teaching the children of miners and loggers who lived in communities along the railway tracks." The programs had a common objective – to bring education to children in isolated communities.

By the 1950s, the correspondence course program had expanded to include a complete set of secondary school courses allowing for students to receive a high school diploma entirely through distance education.

On April 1, 2002, the ILC was transferred from the Ministry of Education to the Ontario Educational Communications Authority which also operates TVOntario.

In recent years, TVO ILC has evolved its service offering to include the latest software and internet-based delivery techniques. The ILC serves approximately 20,000 Ontarians a year, and learners can do all their coursework either offline, online or a combination of both.

== Service model ==
=== Courses ===
TVO ILC offers Ontario Ministry of Education approved distance education courses including high-school credit courses listed in the e-guide, credit and non-credit courses in English as a Second Language (ESL).

Students can earn an Ontario Secondary School Diploma upon successfully completing online ILC high school courses. Courses are available in all pathways: Academic, Applied, and Open for Grades 9 and 10; College Preparation, University Preparation, Workplace Preparation, and Open for Grades 11 and 12. The ILC can help students arrange to complete the Ontario Secondary School Literacy Test and community involvement activities.

=== GED Testing ===
GED Testing permits adults, aged 18 and over, who have been out of school for more than one year, and not completed high school the opportunity to demonstrate that they have acquired the knowledge and skills associated with, and comparable to high school completion. To earn the GED Ontario High School Equivalency Certificate a candidate must complete a series of tests covering mathematics, science, reading, writing and critical thinking skills. TVO ILC administers GED Testing at locations around Ontario.

=== Educational services ===
TVO ILC provides prior learning assessment and recognition advice for mature students (PLAR), to assist adult learners in acquiring credits by having their prior learning experiences, gained outside of an Ontario high school, assessed and recognized as equivalent to Ontario secondary school credits.

== Awards ==
- 2001 Award of Excellence for Leveraging Technology to Enhance Education, Showcase Ontario Delivering IT as an Enabler Awards
- 2005 Award of Excellence, Association for Media Technology in Education in Canada
- 2007 Canadian New Media Award for Excellence in Education
- 2010 Outstanding Achievement Award, Education category, Interactive Media Awards.

== See also ==
- American Council on Education
