= H S Ferns =

Canadian historian (1913–1992)

Professor Henry Stanley Ferns
- Born: 16 December 1913; Strathmore, Alberta, Canada
- Died: 19 February 1992 (aged 78); Birmingham, United Kingdom
- Education: University of Manitoba (BA); Queen's University, Kingston (MA); University of Cambridge (MA, PhD)
- Known for: The Age of Mackenzie King: The Rise of the Leader (1955); Britain and Argentina in the Nineteenth Century (1960); Reading from Left to Right: One Man's Political History (1983)
- Spouse: Maureen Jack (m. 1940)
- Children: John, Pat, Chris and Eleanor
- Scientific career
- Fields: Political Science, History
- Institutions: University of Birmingham

Henry Stanley Ferns (16 December 1913 – 19 February 1992), known as Harry Ferns, was a Canadian-born historian of Anglo-Argentine relations.

== Background and career ==
Ferns was born in Strathmore, Alberta, the eldest son of a poultry farmer. He was educated at St John's High School in Winnipeg, the University of Manitoba, Queen's University, Kingston, and Trinity College, Cambridge, where he graduated with a first-class degree in history in 1938. Having won a scholarship to study at Cambridge, it was while travelling on a passenger ship across the Atlantic to take up his place that Ferns met a retired Indian Army major, who "advised him not to wear his bowler hat in Cambridge and converted him to the communist cause." Upon arriving in Britain he thus became an assiduous far-left student activist, at one stage convening the 'colonial group' of the university's Communist Party (although, according to his obituary in The Times, he refrained from becoming a "dues-paying member" of the party itself). His closest associates in that group were Victor Kiernan, Pieter Keuneman and Mohan Kumaramangalam.

Returning to Canada in 1939, Ferns joined the civil service and worked for a time in the private office of the Canadian Prime Minister, Mackenzie King, before leaving in 1944 to teach at his alma mater, the University of Manitoba. Having been offered and then denied the opportunity to lecture in history at a naval college in British Columbia – which he believed was due to his having been blacklisted – he later returned to Cambridge to study for a PhD. In 1950 he obtained a post teaching modern history and government at the University of Birmingham, becoming professor and founding head of the political science department in 1961. He retired from the university in 1981.

== Books ==
In terms of his academic output, Ferns is perhaps best remembered today for the biography of Mackenzie King that he co-authored with Bernard Ostry, The Age of Mackenzie King: The Rise of the Leader (1955). Although the book was "viewed with shock" in Canada because of its somewhat critical view of King, it was received well elsewhere. Equally important, however, were Ferns's pioneering works on the history of Anglo-Argentine relations. In 1960, he published Britain and Argentina in the Nineteenth Century, which "established his eminence as a scholar in Latin American affairs". Later publications include Argentina (1969), La crisis de Baring, 1890-1893 (1969), and The Argentine Republic, 1516-1971 (1973).

== Political views ==
By the 1960s, Ferns had renounced his earlier communist ideals and come to embrace free-market economics – a journey from Marxism to proto-Thatcherism that led Eric Hobsbawm, who knew him as a fellow communist at Cambridge, to describe him as "extremely conservative". His main ideological preoccupation at that time concerned the idea of the "independent [i.e., non-state] university", and in 1967 he authored a polemical work, Towards an Independent University, that was published as a pamphlet by the Institute of Economic Affairs. His efforts in this area were eventually rewarded with the establishment in 1976 of the University of Buckingham, Britain's first modern-day private higher education institution. Ferns recorded his ongoing political evolution in his memoir, Reading from Left to Right: One Man's Political History (1983).
