= TVO =

Public broadcaster of the Government of Ontario

- Type: Educational television network
- Country: Canada
- Broadcast area: province-wide Ontario; Nationwide
- Stations: CICA-DT, CICO-DT
- Headquarters: Toronto, Ontario

Programming
- Language: English
- Picture format: 1080i HDTV

Ownership
- Owner: Government of Ontario
- Parent: Ontario Educational Communications Authority

History
- Launched: September 27, 1970 (56 years ago)
- Former names: TVOntario

Links
- Website: tvo.me

TVO (stylized in all lowercase as tvo), formerly known as TVOntario, is a Canadian publicly funded English-language educational television network and media organization serving the Canadian province of Ontario. It operates flagship station CICA-DT (channel 19) in Toronto, which also relays programming across portions of Ontario through eight rebroadcast stations. All pay television (cable, satellite, IPTV) providers throughout Ontario are required to carry TVO on their basic tier, and programming can be streamed for free online within Canada.

TVO is operated by the Ontario Educational Communications Authority (OECA), a Crown corporation owned by the Government of Ontario, which since 2022 has done business as the TVO Media Education Group (or TVO.me). TVO.me also operates TVO Today, TVO ILC, TVO Learn, and TVOKids.

== Governance, funding and other responsibilities ==
TVO is governed by a volunteer board of directors, and supported by a network of regional councillors from across the province. TVO also reports to the Ontario legislature through the Minister of Education, in accordance with the Ontario Educational Communications Authority Act.

Instead of following the model of the federally owned Canadian Broadcasting Corporation (CBC)'s television services, which shows commercial advertisements, TVO chose a commercial-free model similar to the Public Broadcasting Service (PBS) in the United States (in fact, various TVO productions wound up being aired on PBS stations). This model was later emulated by provincial educational broadcasters Télé-Québec in Quebec and Knowledge Network in British Columbia.

The majority of TVO's funding is provided by the Government of Ontario through the Ministry of Education, which provides $54.4 million annually, with additional funding provided by charitable donations. In 2023, TVO's total revenue was $66 million.

TVO is also responsible for over-the-air broadcasts of the Ontario Legislative Assembly in some remote Northern Ontario communities that do not receive cable television access to the Ontario Parliament Network.

In 2002, the Ministry of Education transferred responsibility for the Independent Learning Centre—the agency which provides distance education at the elementary and secondary school level—to TVO.

TVO used to operate TFO (Télévision française de l'Ontario), a separate but similar network for Franco-Ontarian audiences. Before the launch of TFO, TVO aired French-language programming on Sundays. Even after TFO's launch, TVO and TFO swapped programming on Sundays well into the 1990s. TFO was separated from TVO and was incorporated under the newly formed GroupeMédia TFO, a separate Crown corporation of the Government of Ontario, in 2007.

In 2017 and 2018, TVO launched four regional "hubs", featuring journalism on issues in the various regions of Ontario, on its website. Hubs are currently based in Thunder Bay for the Northwestern Ontario region, Sudbury for Northeastern Ontario, Kingston for Eastern Ontario, and London for Southwestern Ontario. In 2019, the service also launched an Indigenous hub to cover First Nations issues throughout the province.

== History ==
=== 1970s ===
Logo of the Ontario Educational Communications Authority by Burton Kramer, 1970–1975

The Ontario Educational Communications Authority (OECA) was created in June 1970 by then Education Minister Bill Davis. At that time, the OECA produced children's and educational programming which was aired on commercial television stations.

The CBC, acting on behalf of OECA, applied for and won a licence for the ministry's television station in Toronto. CICA, with the mandate of "[using] electronic and associated media to provide educational opportunities for all people in Ontario". The "CA" in the CICA callsign was derived from the last two letters in the OECA acronym. The CBC operated the CICA transmitter, while the OECA was in charge of programming. OECA assumed all operations of the station, independent of the CBC, when the provincial government declared the Authority an independent corporation in a 1973 Order-in-Council.

TVOntario logo, 1975–1992, by Dick Derhodge

CICA signed on the air at 2 p.m. on September 27, 1970, on UHF channel 19 operating at a radiated power of 423,000 watts video and 84,600 watts audio. The first broadcast lasted for a little over three hours. Its studio facilities were located at 1670 Bayview Avenue (a five-storey office building that is still standing) and its 550 feet (170 m) transmitter antenna was located at 354 Jarvis Street on the CBC tower. In 1972, the station moved its operations to a new studio facility at 2180 Yonge Street in the Canada Square Complex, where it remains. The station's broadcast name was "OECA", sharing the name of its parent organization, but began using the on-air brand "TVOntario" (and later just TVO) beginning in 1974.

When the Global Television Network was originally approved, it was with a proposal that OECA would broadcast across southern Ontario during the daytime using Global's six transmitters, as Global's own programming only ran from 5 p.m. to midnight. However, when Global launched in 1974, this proposal was not implemented.

In the latter half of the 1970s, TVO began adding rebroadcast transmitters in other Ontario communities. Its first rebroadcast transmitter, CICO (now CICO-24), signed on from Ottawa on October 25, 1975.

=== 1980s–1990s ===
TVO logo, 1992–2007

TVO's first major agreement with a foreign broadcaster was with Japan's NHK in 1982. This led to a longtime agreement between the two broadcasters. In 1989, they co-produced the documentary series Global Family, which by 1994 had over 80 episodes. TVO distributed the series in over 50 territories.

In 1987, TVOntario launched La Chaîne française, a French-language public television network which became TFO in 1995. The Ontario government under Mike Harris promised to privatize TVOntario. They never carried through on this plan, but did cut its budget.

An estimated 2.4 million Ontarians watched TVO in 1995.

=== 2000s ===
TVO logo, 2007–2015

The positions of chair and CEO were divided in 2005. Film producer Peter O'Brian was appointed chairman and Lisa de Wilde became CEO. On June 29, 2006, the provincial Ministry of Education announced a major overhaul of TVO: its production capabilities would be upgraded to fully digital systems by 2009 (ministry funding would be allocated for this); and TFO would be spun off into a separate organization.

Moreover, programming changes were announced later that day: thirteen hours of new weekly children's educational programming was added, Studio 2 was replaced by The Agenda, and More to Life and Vox were cancelled. The move to digitize services represents a transition; The Globe and Mail quoted TVO CEO Lisa de Wilde saying "while television will remain an important medium for TVO, the days of defining ourselves as only a broadcaster are past."

In 2002, the Independent Learning Centre, which is responsible for distance education at the elementary and secondary school level, and for GED testing, was transferred from the Ministry of Education to TVO.

TVO logo, 2015–2022

== Chairs and CEOs ==
- Thomas Ide (1970–1979)
- Jim Parr (1979–1985)
- John Radford (1985)
- Bernard Ostry (1985–1991)
- Peter Herrndorf (1992–1999)
- Isabel Bassett (1999–2005)

The positions of Chair of the Board and CEO were divided in 2005

=== Chair ===
- Peter O'Brian (2005–2018)
- Chris Day (2020–present)

=== CEO ===
- Lisa de Wilde (2005–2019)
- Jeffrey Orridge (November 30, 2020 — August 2025)
- Pary Bell (January 2026–present)

== Programming ==
TVO airs a mixture of original children's programming, documentaries, scripted dramas, and public affairs programs.

Children's programming is aired daily during a daytime television block branded as TVOKids, with general-audience programming airing during prime time and overnight hours for adult viewers. The programming started in 1994.

Scripted dramas are typically foreign imports, past selections include the Danish political drama Borgen and the British police procedural New Tricks. TVO's first original drama series was Hard Rock Medical, a medical drama set in Sudbury, which aired from 2013 to 2018. Public affairs programming includes the flagship daily current affairs show The Agenda and an overnight rebroadcast of the Legislative Assembly of Ontario's Question Period from the Ontario Parliament Network.

All TVO programming is aired in English or in another language with English subtitles. French-language programs were previously shown on Sundays, from noon until sign-off, for the benefit of Franco-Ontarian viewers. The establishment of French counterpart network TFO led to the discontinuation of French-language programming on TVO by the mid-1990s.

=== Former programming ===
Earlier in TVO's history, all dramatic programming was required to have some educational content. Therefore actors, journalists or writers were hired to provide commentary on shows aired by TVO that would place them within an educational context. For instance, Tom Grattan's War was bookmarked by segments hosted by Andrea Martin that would use scenes from the series to discuss filmmaking techniques. Episodes of The Prisoner were hosted by journalist Warner Troyer whose segments included interviews with the actors and a discussion of vavoxrious psychological, philosophical or sociological themes regarding the series. Similarly, Doctor Who was hosted by science fiction author Judith Merril who would discuss each week's episode to explore various themes in science and science fiction. Saturday Night at the Movies continued to follow this format long after the requirement was dropped because of the popularity of its host, Elwy Yost.

== Distribution ==
TVO is Canada's oldest educational television service. It established the country's first UHF television station in 1970, based in Toronto. TVO used to have the largest over-the-air coverage in Ontario, reaching 98.5% of the province with 216 transmitters; however this is no longer the case as the broadcaster shuttered the majority of its analog transmitters except those located in some mandatory markets, which were converted to digital in 2011 (see "Technical information" below). TVO is carried on all cable systems serving Ontario (the alternative choice for those viewers in area that has been served by one of the service's defunct analog transmitters). On satellite systems in Ontario, it is carried on Bell Satellite TV channel 265, and on Shaw Direct channel 155.

The main transmitter in Toronto uses the call sign CICA-DT, with its rebroadcasters using CICO-DT followed by a number to denote their status as rebroadcasters. Many analog transmitters used CICA-TV and CICO-TV callsigns, in addition to CICE-TV, until the shutdown of TVO's remaining analog transmitters on July 31, 2012.

TVO's transmitters are primarily located in Ontario, with the only exception being its Ottawa transmitter, CICO-DT-24, which is based at Camp Fortune in Chelsea, Quebec. There, it shares its site with its Quebec counterpart, Télé-Québec, and with most of the region's television and FM radio signals.

From the 1970s through the 1990s, TVO ran top-of-the-hour bumpers where an announcer would mention the channel allocation of the service's flagship station in Toronto, along with an allocation for one of its rebroadcast transmitters: "This is TVOntario. Channel 19 in Toronto, channel XX in (city/town/region)."

== Technical information ==
=== Subchannel ===
Subchannel	Res.	Short name	Programming
xx.1	1080i	TVO	Main TVO programming

=== Analog-to-digital conversion ===
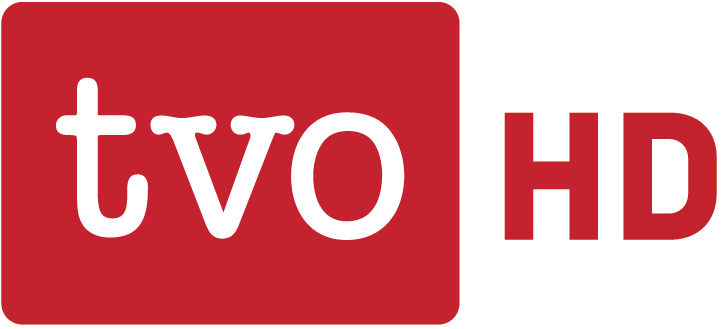
TVO HD logo from 2010 to 2015

In August 2010, TVO began broadcasting in high-definition via a direct-to-cable HD feed. TVO commenced over-the-air HD broadcasting in August 2011, in compliance with the CRTC regulations. Except for Belleville, Chatham and Cloyne, TVO's transmitters are located within mandatory markets for conversion. Not all digital transmitters are currently broadcasting in high definition.

The Belleville, Chatham and Cloyne transmitters were converted to digital on new frequencies (but without high-definition, an on-channel program guide or other DTV-specific features), as channels 52 to 69 were being reallocated for wireless communication purposes. The conversion of these transmitters took place before TVO's announcement to close down its analog transmitter network outside the mandatory markets.

=== Transmitters ===
Station	City of licence	Virtual channel	RF channel	ERP	HAAT	Transmitter coordinates
CICA-DT	Toronto	19	19 (UHF)	106.5 kW	491 m (1,611 ft)	43°38′33″N 79°23′14″W
CICO-DT	Thunder Bay	9	9 (VHF)	4.5 kW	218.7 m (718 ft)	48°33′2″N 89°13′25″W
CICO-DT-18	London	18	18 (UHF)	2.4 kW	316 m (1,037 ft)	42°57′16″N 81°21′17″W
CICO-DT-24	Ottawa	24	24 (UHF)	95 kW	340.7 m (1,118 ft)	45°30′9″N 75°50′59″W
CICO-DT-28	Kitchener	22	28 (UHF)	20.2 kW	289.5 m (950 ft)	43°15′41″N 80°26′41″W
CICO-DT-32	Windsor	19	19 (UHF)	19 kW	214.3 m (703 ft)	42°9′12″N 82°57′11″W
CICO-DT-53	Belleville	22	22 (UHF)	13 kW	188.6 m (619 ft)	44°18′45″N 77°12′24″W
CICO-DT-59	Chatham	34	34 (UHF)	1 kW	218.5 m (717 ft)	42°27′0″N 82°4′59″W
CICO-DT-92	Cloyne	21	21 (UHF)	7.46 kW	166 m (545 ft)	44°52′48″N 77°11′51″W

On January 25, 2017, TVO announced it would be shutting down eight of its nine remaining transmitters (a mere 5 1/2 years after converting them to digital), leaving only CICA-DT at Toronto's CN Tower in operation to maintain their current license. CEO Lisa de Wilde announced that shutting down the transmitters would save the broadcaster an estimated $1 million per year, but would also lay off seven transmitter maintenance jobs. Critics of the decision, including the group Friends of Canadian Broadcasting, said that the changes would affect people who have no other options for accessing content.

TVO formally applied to the CRTC on January 25, 2017, to remove its eight transmitters outside Toronto from service.

In response to feedback from the towns and cities affected by the planned shutdown, as well as TVO donors and other groups, TVO reversed its decision to shut down the transmitters on February 17, 2017. According to TVO, the Government of Ontario agreed to increase TVO's annual funding by $1 million to offset the amount that would have been saved by shutting down the transmitters. On March 1, 2017, TVO formally withdrew its CRTC application to delete its eight retransmitters from its licence.

In April 2017, ISED required TVO to move its newly-digital retransmitters serving Belleville, Chatham, Cloyne, Kitchener, and Windsor from out of the 600 MHz band between 2019 and 2020 as part of the related spectrum pack.

On April 17, 2020, the CRTC granted TVO permission to decrease its Chatham transmitter's maximum effective radiated power (ERP) from 2,250 to 1,000 watts. Even though this would reduce over-the-air access to viewers in the Chatham area, the CRTC approved TVO's request so that it could "reduce the costs associated with the required channel change by re-using its existing antenna" as part of Canada's 600 MHz spectrum repack. TVO announced it would make the change as of May 1, 2020. TVO similarly reduced the ERP of its other retransmitters required to move out of the 600 MHz band.

=== Former transmitters ===
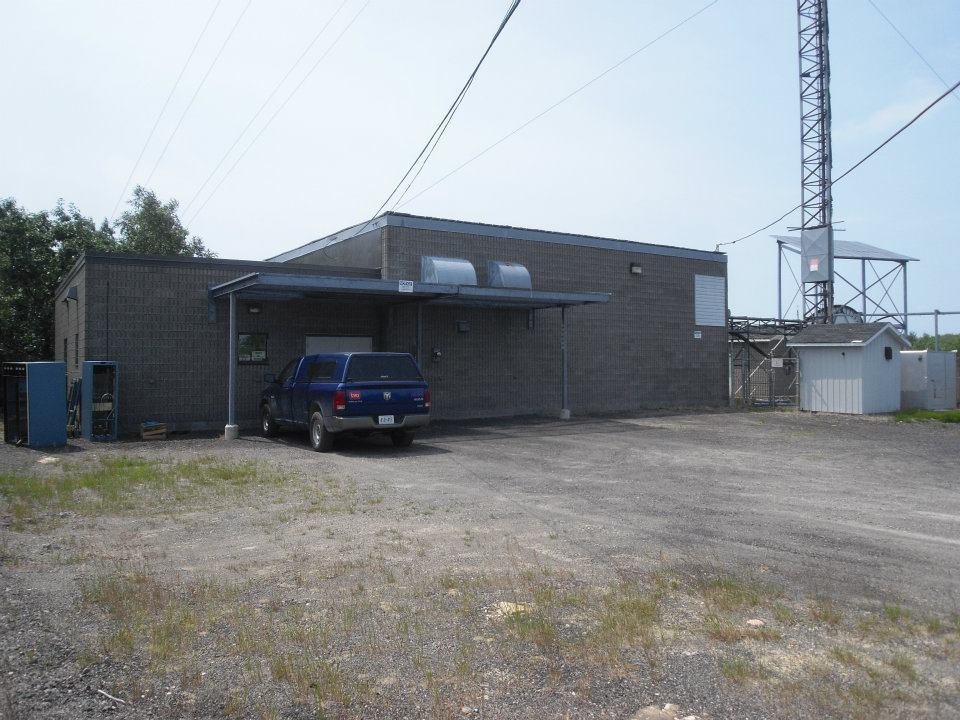
TVO staff shuttering Sudbury analog antenna

On July 31, 2012, TVO permanently shut down its remaining 114 analog transmitters (14 full-power and 100 low-power) without converting them to digital; these were in areas of Ontario not considered "mandatory markets" for digital conversion by the CRTC. In many cases, TVO rebroadcasters were operating from CBC-owned transmitter sites and were shut down along with the CBC's analog transmitters. Where TVO owned sites, it provided local communities the option of taking ownership of the towers and transmitters.

==== Low-power transmitters ====
Station	City of licence	Channel	ERP	HAAT	Transmitter coordinates	CRTC Decision/Notes
CICA-TV-56	Alberton	7 (VHF)	0.01 kW	NA	48°36′44″N 93°31′1″W	
CICO-TV-55	Algoma Mills	45 (UHF)	0.02 kW	NA	NA	
CICE-TV-12	Allanwater	15 (UHF)	NA	NA	NA	
CICO-TV-30	Angling Lake	9 (VHF)	0.005 kW	NA	53°50′41″N 89°31′40″W	
CICO-TV-90	Armstrong	13 (VHF)	0.01 kW	NA	50°18′11″N 89°2′14″W	87-39
CICA-TV-1	Aroland	10 (VHF)	0.005 kW	NA	50°13′39″N 86°57′28″W	
CICA-TV-90	Attawapiskat	10 (VHF)	0.01 kW	NA	52°55′48″N 82°25′28″W	
CICE-TV-19	Barclay Township (north)	13 (VHF)	0.01 kW	NA	49°50′1″N 92°48′8″W	91-845
CICO-TV-17	Barclay Township (south)	30 (UHF)	0.02 kW	NA	49°47′34″N 92°44′36″W	85-851
CICA-TV-57	Barwick	21 (UHF)	0.02 kW	NA	48°39′1″N 93°59′3″W	
CICO-TV-82	Batchawana Bay	17 (UHF)	0.02 kW	NA	46°55′55″N 84°36′5″W	
CICA-TV-82	Beardmore	11 (VHF)	0.01 kW	NA	49°36′10″N 87°57′26″W	
CICA-TV-47	Bearskin Lake	9 (VHF)	0.005 kW	NA	53°55′28″N 90°58′1″W	84-47
CICA-TV-40	Belle Vallée	34 (UHF)	0.02 kW	NA	47°39′5″N 79°35′31″W	
CICA-TV-84	Bergland	7 (VHF)	0.01 kW	NA	48°56′36″N 94°23′41″W	
CICA-TV-66	Big Trout Lake	8 (VHF)	0.01 kW	NA	53°49′26″N 89°52′35″W	91-1
CICO-TV-97	Birch Island	56 (UHF)	0.02 kW	NA	46°4′3″N 81°46′29″W	88-788
CICE-TV-13	Brethour	22 (UHF)	0.02 kW	NA	47°42′34″N 79°34′1″W	
CICO-TV-64	Britt	15 (UHF)	0.02 kW	NA	45°46′47″N 80°33′5″W	86-363
CICA-TV-43	Bruce Mines	24 (UHF)	0.02 kW	NA	46°18′8″N 83°46′49″W	
CICA-TV-72	Caramat	10 (VHF)	0.005 kW	NA	49°36′40″N 86°9′3″W	
CICA-TV-2	Cartier	17 (UHF)	0.02 kW	NA	46°42′6″N 81°32′55″W	
CICA-TV-30	Cat Lake	9 (VHF)	0.005 kW	NA	51°43′12″N 91°48′56″W	
CICO-TV-83	Chamberlain	61 (UHF)	0.02 kW	NA	47°53′58″N 79°56′43″W	
CICO-TV-21	Charlton	43 (UHF)	0.02 kW	NA	47°48′35″N 80°0′49″W	
CICA-TV-31	Coleman	38 (UHF)	0.02 kW	NA	47°22′42″N 79°44′18″W	
CICA-TV-32	Collins	8 (VHF)	0.005 kW	NA	50°17′41″N 89°26′45″W	
CICA-TV-20	Constance Lake	13 (VHF)	0.01 kW	NA	49°48′23″N 84°8′38″W	
CICO-TV-98	Coppell	14 (UHF)	0.02 kW	NA	49°32′7″N 83°50′22″W	
CICO-TV-65	Dack	59 (UHF)	0.02 kW	NA	47°48′42″N 79°55′12″W	
CICA-TV-8	Deer Lake	9 (VHF)	0.005 kW	NA	52°37′8″N 94°2′52″W	
CICO-TV-66	Desbarats	42 (UHF)	0.02 kW	NA	46°20′47″N 83°55′35″W	
CICA-TV-62	Devlin	43 (UHF)	0.02 kW	NA	48°37′13″N 93°40′17″W	
CICA-TV-33	Dobie	16 (UHF)	0.02 kW	NA	48°7′55″N 79°49′23″W	
CICA-TV-48	Dorion	6 (VHF)	0.01 kW	NA	48°47′8″N 88°33′40″W	
CICO-TV-99	Eagle Lake 27	32 (UHF)	0.02 kW	NA	49°43′50″N 93°3′12″W	
CICA-TV-88	Eagle River	11 (VHF)	0.01 kW	NA	49°47′28″N 93°11′33″W	
CICA-TV-11	Ear Falls	3 (VHF)	0.01 kW	NA	50°38′24″N 93°13′59″W	
CICA-TV-34	Earlton	31 (UHF)	0.02 kW	NA	47°42′37″N 79°49′23″W	
CICA-TV-35	Elk Lake	17 (UHF)	0.02 kW	NA	47°43′50″N 80°19′52″W	
CICA-TV-76	Emo	8 (VHF)	0.01 kW	NA	48°38′2″N 93°50′21″W	
CICA-TV-36	Englehart	39 (UHF)	0.02 kW	NA	47°49′30″N 79°52′21″W	
CICO-TV-46	Eton-Rugby	26 (UHF)	0.02 kW	NA	49°52′47″N 93°0′18″W	
CICA-TV-67	Eva Lake	6 (VHF)	0.01 kW	NA	48°45′0″N 91°13′1″W	
CICE-TV-20	Evansville	24 (UHF)	0.04 kW	NA	45°47′2″N 82°34′6″W	
CICO-TV-67	Evanturel	57 (UHF)	0.02 kW	NA	47°47′55″N 79°49′18″W	
CICA-TV-92	Fauquier	29 (UHF)	0.02 kW	NA	49°18′23″N 82°2′12″W	
CICA-TV-24	Foleyet	11 (VHF)	0.01 kW	NA	48°14′23″N 82°26′24″W	
CICA-TV-58	Fort Albany	5 (VHF)	0.01 kW	NA	52°12′30″N 81°41′11″W	
CICA-TV-25	Fort Hope	9 (VHF)	0.005 kW	NA	51°33′17″N 87°54′11″W	
CICA-TV-59	Fort Severn	9 (VHF)	0.005 kW	NA	55°59′36″N 87°37′30″W	
CICO-TV-33	Gogama	17 (UHF)	0.02 kW	NA	47°40′45″N 81°43′21″W	
CICA-TV-21	Gore Bay	28 (UHF)	0.02 kW	NA	45°55′12″N 82°27′53″W	
CICO-TV-77	Goulais River	28 (UHF)	0.02 kW	NA	46°43′13″N 84°22′56″W	86-734
CICA-TV-37	Gowganda	10 (VHF)	0.01 kW	NA	47°39′19″N 80°46′22″W	
CICO-TV-34	Grassy Narrows	18 (UHF)	0.02 kW	NA	50°9′24″N 93°59′39″W	
CICO-TV-47	Gull Bay	15 (UHF)	0.02 kW	NA	49°48′16″N 89°6′24″W	
CICO-TV-68	Hallam	55 (UHF)	0.02 kW	NA	46°14′49″N 81°50′8″W	
CICA-TV-3	Hallebourg	18 (UHF)	0.02 kW	NA	49°40′0″N 83°30′42″W	
CICA-TV-41	Hanbury	51 (UHF)	0.02 kW	NA	47°35′40″N 79°40′25″W	
CICA-TV-14	Harris	29 (UHF)	0.02 kW	NA	47°31′1″N 79°36′33″W	
CICA-TV-93	Harty	53 (UHF)	0.02 kW	NA	49°28′35″N 82°40′48″W	
CICO-TV-22	Hawk Junction	24 (UHF)	0.02 kW	NA	48°5′16″N 84°33′43″W	
CICO-TV-96	Hawkesbury	48 (UHF)	10 kW	100 m	45°30′7″N 74°41′16″W	
CICO-TV-23	Heron Bay	17 (UHF)	0.02 kW	NA	48°37′32″N 86°16′5″W	
CICA-TV-4	Hilliardton	55 (UHF)	0.02 kW	NA	47°43′28″N 79°41′43″W	
CICA-TV-5	Hilton Beach	17 (UHF)	0.02 kW	NA	46°15′18″N 83°53′46″W	
CICA-TV-15	Hudson	25 (UHF)	0.02 kW	NA	47°32′17″N 79°48′3″W	
CICA-TV-89	Hudson (Kenora)	19 (UHF)	0.02 kW	NA	50°5′28″N 92°10′11″W	
CICA-TV-13	Huntsville	13 (VHF)	31.9 kW	181.7 m	45°15′46″N 79°21′45″W	
CICA-TV-26	Ignace	5 (VHF)	0.01 kW	NA	49°24′56″N 91°39′47″W	
CICA-TV-9	Iron Bridge	23 (UHF)	0.02 kW	NA	46°16′46″N 83°13′0″W	
CICA-TV-81	Jellicoe	6 (VHF)	0.005 kW	NA	49°41′12″N 87°31′42″W	
CICE-TV-23	Kaboni	24 (UHF)	0.04 kW	NA	45°40′15″N 81°45′31″W	
CICA-TV-16	Kagawong	34 (UHF)	0.02 kW	NA	45°54′16″N 82°15′29″W	
CICO-TV-84	Karalash Corners	41 (UHF)	0.02 kW	NA	46°46′12″N 84°21′22″W	
CICA-TV-27	Kasabonika	9 (VHF)	0.005 kW	NA	53°31′50″N 88°36′36″W	
CICO-TV-78	Kashabowie	15 (UHF)	0.02 kW	NA	48°39′11″N 90°26′57″W	
CICE-TV-17	Kashechewan	2 (VHF)	0.005 kW	NA	52°17′30″N 81°38′23″W	
CICE-TV-21	Keewaywin	2 (VHF)	0.005 kW	NA	53°0′33″N 92°48′0″W	
CICO-TV-35	Kejick Bay	3 (VHF)	0.005 kW	NA	50°17′34″N 92°18′6″W	
CICO-TV-69	Kenabeek	56 (UHF)	0.02 kW	NA	47°38′23″N 79°58′24″W	
CICO-TV-70	Kenogami	15 (UHF)	0.02 kW	NA	48°6′51″N 80°12′52″W	
CICO-TV-91	Kenora	44 (UHF)	123.03 kW	157.8 m	49°42′8″N 94°47′15″W	
CICO-TV-1	Kerns	46 (UHF)	0.02 kW	NA	47°36′18″N 79°48′11″W	
CICO-TV-85	Killarney	44 (UHF)	0.02 kW	NA	45°58′18″N 81°30′45″W	
CICA-TV-17	King Kirkland	32 (UHF)	0.02 kW	NA	48°9′11″N 79°57′21″W	
CICA-TV-68	Kingfisher Lake	8 (VHF)	0.005 kW	NA	53°1′55″N 89°49′1″W	
CICO-TV-38	Kingston	38 (UHF)	171.79 kW	180.4 m	44°17′25″N 76°28′42″W	
CICE-TV-18	Kirby's Corner	30 (UHF)	0.04 kW	NA	46°42′49″N 84°16′39″W	
CICO-TV-43	Kitigan	17 (UHF)	0.02 kW	NA	49°23′5″N 82°19′7″W	
CICE-TV-25	Lac La Croix	12 (VHF)	0.005 kW	NA	48°22′36″N 92°9′55″W	
CICO-TV-2	Lac-Ste-Therese	20 (UHF)	0.02 kW	NA	49°47′30″N 83°39′10″W	
CICO-TV-3	Laird	15 (UHF)	0.02 kW	NA	46°23′52″N 84°4′24″W	
CICO-TV-50	Lake Helen	21 (UHF)	0.02 kW	NA	49°1′43″N 88°14′45″W	
CICO-TV-25	Lansdowne House	8 (VHF)	0.005 kW	NA	52°13′13″N 87°53′13″W	
CICA-TV-38	Larder Lake	24 (UHF)	0.02 kW	NA	48°6′4″N 79°42′52″W	
CICA-TV-39	Latchford	24 (UHF)	0.02 kW	NA	47°19′52″N 79°48′40″W	
CICO-TV-71	Lee Valley	49 (UHF)	0.02 kW	NA	46°12′24″N 81°56′20″W	
CICA-TV-22	Little Current	33 (UHF)	0.02 kW	NA	45°58′55″N 81°55′57″W	
CICA-TV-71	Longlac	5 (VHF)	0.01 kW	NA	49°46′38″N 86°31′41″W	
CICA-TV-83	Macdiarmid	5 (VHF)	0.005 kW	NA	49°26′15″N 88°7′50″W	
CICE-TV-1	Mackenzie	36 (UHF)	0.02 kW	NA	48°31′54″N 88°56′51″W	
CICO-TV-86	Madawaska	16 (UHF)	0.02 kW	NA	45°30′5″N 77°59′8″W	
CICA-TV-44	Manitowaning	40 (UHF)	0.02 kW	NA	45°44′15″N 81°48′52″W	
CICA-TV-60	Marten Falls	9 (VHF)	0.005 kW	NA	51°38′13″N 85°56′27″W	
CICA-TV-53	Massey	24 (UHF)	0.02 kW	NA	46°12′37″N 82°4′38″W	84-99
CICA-TV-61	Matachewan	32 (UHF)	0.02 kW	NA	47°56′23″N 80°38′6″W	
CICA-TV-94	Mattice	9 (VHF)	0.01 kW	NA	49°36′25″N 83°15′45″W	
CICO-TV-93	McArthur's Mills (Bancroft)	42 (UHF)	140.6 kW	149.4 m	45°5′18″N 77°38′49″W	
CICE-TV-2	Michipicoten River	39 (UHF)	0.02 kW	NA	47°56′14″N 84°49′5″W	
CICO-TV-54	Minaki	10 (VHF)	0.01 kW	NA	49°59′40″N 94°40′7″W	
CICA-TV-54	Mindemoya	42 (UHF)	0.02 kW	NA	45°43′49″N 82°11′36″W	
CICA-TV-65	Mine Centre	8 (VHF)	0.01 kW	NA	48°45′37″N 92°37′16″W	
CICO-TV-72	Missanabie	18 (UHF)	0.02 kW	NA	48°18′41″N 84°4′58″W	
CICA-TV-95	Moonbeam	35 (UHF)	0.02 kW	NA	49°20′32″N 82°8′43″W	
CICA-TV-91	Moosonee	11 (VHF)	0.01 kW	NA	51°16′29″N 80°38′39″W	
CICA-TV-64	Morson	11 (VHF)	0.01 kW	NA	49°5′46″N 94°19′27″W	
CICO-TV-36	Muskrat Dam	8 (VHF)	0.005 kW	NA	53°24′15″N 91°46′9″W	
CICO-TV-5	Nairn	28 (UHF)	0.02 kW	NA	46°20′6″N 81°34′59″W	
CICA-TV-80	Nakina	11 (VHF)	0.01 kW	NA	50°10′43″N 86°42′23″W	
CICA-TV-79	Nestor Falls	13 (VHF)	0.01 kW	NA	49°8′13″N 93°55′26″W	
CICO-TV-6	New Osnaburg	5 (VHF)	0.005 kW	NA	51°13′57″N 90°14′1″W	
CICA-TV-74	Nipigon	32 (UHF)	0.02 kW	NA	49°0′58″N 88°15′54″W	
CICA-TV-6	North Bay	6 (VHF)	95 kW	203.3 m	46°3′46″N 79°26′4″W	
CICO-TV-79	North Branch	18 (UHF)	0.02 kW	NA	48°52′5″N 94°10′55″W	
CICO-TV-37	North Spirit Lake	9 (VHF)	0.005 kW	NA	52°30′32″N 93°0′55″W	
CICE-TV-10	Northwest Angle LR 3	10 (VHF)	0.01 kW	NA	49°21′55″N 95°1′6″W	
CICA-TV-69	Oba	11 (VHF)	0.005 kW	NA	49°3′33″N 84°6′34″W	
CICA-TV-96	Opasatika	47 (UHF)	0.02 kW	NA	49°31′39″N 82°51′23″W	
CICA-TV-12	Owen Sound	12 (VHF)	125 kW	134 m	44°26′39″N 81°2′37″W	
CICO-TV-39	Oxdrift	22 (UHF)	0.02 kW	NA	49°48′50″N 92°58′23″W	
CICE-TV-11	Parry Sound	42 (UHF)	7.57 kW	107.1 m	45°23′24″N 80°2′20″W	
CICE-TV-15	Pays Plat	23 (UHF)	0.02 kW	NA	48°53′3″N 87°33′25″W	91-3
CICO-TV-56	Pearl	19 (UHF)	0.02 kW	NA	48°39′37″N 88°39′44″W	
CICE-TV-3	Peawanuck	5 (VHF)	0.01 kW	NA	55°0′46″N 85°25′22″W	
CICE-TV-16	Pembroke	29 (UHF)	119.4 kW	188 m	45°50′2″N 77°9′49″W	
CICA-TV-51	Penetanguishene	51 (UHF)	136.8 kW	184.7 m	44°46′10″N 79°59′24″W	
CICO-TV-74	Peterborough	18 (UHF)	781.62 kW	284.4 m	44°7′15″N 78°8′10″W	
CICO-TV-51	Pic Mobert	18 (UHF)	0.02 kW	NA	48°41′24″N 85°38′28″W	
CICA-TV-75	Pickle Lake	11 (VHF)	0.01 kW	NA	51°28′5″N 90°11′11″W	
CICA-TV-70	Pikangikum	9 (VHF)	0.005 kW	NA	51°48′27″N 93°59′37″W	
CICA-TV-86	Pinewood	12 (VHF)	0.01 kW	NA	48°42′49″N 94°18′13″W	
CICE-TV-24	Pointe au Baril	23 (UHF)	0.02 kW	NA	45°35′36″N 80°22′51″W	
CICO-TV-40	Poplar Hill	8 (VHF)	0.005 kW	NA	52°6′3″N 94°18′12″W	
CICE-TV-4	Prince Township	29 (UHF)	0.02 kW	15.3 m	46°31′35″N 84°32′7″W	
CICO-TV-26	Providence Bay	48 (UHF)	0.02 kW	NA	45°40′37″N 82°16′15″W	
CICO-TV-80	Quibell	31 (UHF)	0.02 kW	NA	49°57′32″N 93°25′33″W	
CICO-TV-73	Rainy Lake	17 (UHF)	0.02 kW	NA	48°51′31″N 93°34′21″W	
CICO-TV-57	Rainy Lake	27 (UHF)	0.02 kW	NA	48°42′26″N 93°56′38″W	
CICA-TV-77	Rainy River	4 (VHF)	0.01 kW	NA	48°43′15″N 94°33′46″W	
CICO-TV-41	Red Lake	15 (UHF)	0.1 kW	NA	51°1′5″N 93°50′6″W	
CICA-TV-49	Redditt	5 (VHF)	0.01 kW	NA	49°58′48″N 94°23′30″W	
CICO-TV-75	Richards Landing	34 (UHF)	0.02 kW	NA	46°16′47″N 84°2′2″W	
CICO-TV-58	Rossport	18 (UHF)	0.02 kW	NA	48°50′8″N 87°31′13″W	
CICO-TV-7	Ryland	16 (UHF)	0.02 kW	NA	49°42′42″N 83°48′0″W	
CICE-TV-5	Sabaskong Bay	32 (UHF)	0.02 kW	NA	49°10′15″N 93°55′40″W	
CICA-TV-50	Sachigo Lake	9 (VHF)	0.005 kW	NA	53°52′8″N 92°10′19″W	
CICA-TV-52	Sandy Lake	8 (VHF)	0.01 kW	NA	53°3′25″N 93°19′39″W	
CICO-TV-20	Sault Ste. Marie	20 (UHF)	6.1 kW	198.1 m	46°35′42″N 84°21′3″W	
CICA-TV-63	Savant Lake	10 (VHF)	0.005 kW	NA	50°15′30″N 90°42′1″W	
CICO-TV-60	Savard	19 (UHF)	0.04 kW	NA	47°50′48″N 80°4′59″W	
CICE-TV-6	Scoble	35 (UHF)	NA	NA	NA	
CICO-TV-8	Searchmont	22 (UHF)	0.02 kW	NA	46°46′39″N 84°3′2″W	
CICO-TV-87	Seine River	19 (UHF)	0.02 kW	NA	48°43′13″N 92°25′37″W	
CICO-TV-61	Serpent River	51 (UHF)	0.02 kW	NA	NA	
CICE-TV-7	Shakespeare Township	14 (UHF)	0.02 kW	NA	46°17′31″N 81°52′40″W	
CICO-TV-48	Shebandowan	17 (UHF)	0.02 kW	NA	48°37′29″N 90°4′2″W	
CICO-TV-27	Shoal Lake	19 (UHF)	0.02 kW	NA	49°37′37″N 95°5′53″W	
CICO-TV-10	Silver Water	20 (UHF)	0.02 kW	NA	45°51′30″N 82°51′16″W	
CICA-TV-85	Sioux Lookout	2 (VHF)	0.01 kW	NA	50°6′17″N 91°55′10″W	
CICA-TV-78	Sioux Narrows	10 (VHF)	0.01 kW	NA	49°24′25″N 94°5′36″W	
CICE-TV-14	Slate Falls	15 (UHF)	0.02 kW	NA	51°9′42″N 91°35′2″W	
CICE-TV-8	South Gillies	33 (UHF)	0.02 kW	NA	48°14′24″N 89°41′57″W	
CICO-TV-62	Spragge	31 (UHF)	0.02 kW	NA	NA	
CICA-TV-23	Spring Bay	46 (UHF)	0.02 kW	NA	45°43′56″N 82°19′14″W	
CICA-TV-73	Stratton	19 (UHF)	0.02 kW	NA	48°40′56″N 94°9′50″W	
CICO-TV-19	Sudbury	19 (UHF)	285 kW	171.9 m	46°25′29″N 81°0′53″W	
CICA-TV-45	Sultan	11 (VHF)	0.01 kW	NA	47°35′37″N 82°45′30″W	
CICO-TV-81	Summer Beaver	12 (VHF)	0.005 kW	NA	52°45′1″N 88°30′48″W	
CICO-TV-11	Tehkummah	49 (UHF)	0.02 kW	NA	45°39′28″N 81°59′54″W	
CICO-TV-12	Temagami North	23 (UHF)	0.02 kW	NA	47°6′52″N 79°47′18″W	
CICA-TV-19	Temagami	36 (UHF)	0.02 kW	NA	47°3′51″N 79°47′47″W	
CICO-TV-31	Temiskaming Shores	42 (UHF)	0.02 kW	NA	47°32′24″N 79°40′19″W	
CICA-TV-46	Thessalon	27 (UHF)	0.02 kW	NA	46°15′30″N 83°33′23″W	
CICO-TV-13	Thornloe	40 (UHF)	0.02 kW	NA	47°39′54″N 79°45′39″W	
CICA-TV-7	Timmins	7 (VHF)	141.3 kW	197.7 m	48°28′12″N 81°17′49″W	
CICO-TV-95	Tobermory	49 (UHF)	0.05 kW	NA	45°15′10″N 81°39′46″W	
CICO-TV-42	Upsala	11 (VHF)	0.01 kW	NA	49°3′8″N 90°29′26″W	
CICO-TV-14	Val Cote	21 (UHF)	0.02 kW	NA	49°38′37″N 83°24′4″W	
CICA-TV-97	Val Rita	25 (UHF)	0.02 kW	NA	49°26′47″N 82°32′19″W	
CICA-TV-87	Vermilion Bay	7 (VHF)	0.01 kW	NA	49°51′24″N 93°23′9″W	
CICA-TV-98	Virginiatown	36 (UHF)	0.02 kW	NA	48°7′55″N 79°35′7″W	
CICE-TV-9	Wabigoon Lake	21 (UHF)	0.02 kW	NA	49°37′9″N 92°28′37″W	
CICO-TV-29	Wabigoon	18 (UHF)	0.02 kW	NA	49°43′44″N 92°36′41″W	
CICO-TV-44	Walford	32 (UHF)	0.02 kW	NA	46°12′17″N 82°15′26″W	
CICO-TV-88	Warren	21 (UHF)	0.02 kW	NA	46°26′36″N 80°18′23″W	
CICO-TV-45	Watten	23 (UHF)	0.02 kW	NA	48°41′32″N 93°13′45″W	
CICA-TV-99	Weagamow Lake	9 (VHF)	0.005 kW	NA	52°56′52″N 91°20′57″W	
CICA-TV-28	Webequie	9 (VHF)	0.005 kW	NA	52°59′8″N 87°21′23″W	
CICO-TV-15	West Bay	29 (UHF)	0.02 kW	NA	45°49′57″N 82°9′43″W	
CICO-TV-16	Wharncliffe	28 (UHF)	0.02 kW	NA	46°25′15″N 83°24′7″W	
CICA-TV-42	Whitefish Bay	19 (UHF)	0.02 kW	NA	49°24′19″N 93°57′31″W	
CICA-TV-55	Whitefish Falls	27 (UHF)	0.02 kW	NA	46°7′0″N 81°44′19″W	
CICO-TV-89	Whitney	21 (UHF)	0.02 kW	NA	45°29′41″N 78°13′47″W	
CICO-TV-63	Wikwemikong	53 (UHF)	0.02 kW	NA	45°47′53″N 81°43′36″W	
CICO-TV-94	Wild Goose	20 (UHF)	0.02 kW	NA	48°29′50″N 89°3′29″W	
CICA-TV-29	Wunnummin Lake	9 (VHF)	0.005 kW	NA	52°56′13″N 89°17′41″W	

==== Medium-power transmitters ====
Station	City of licence	Channel	ERP	HAAT	Transmitter coordinates	CRTC Decision/Notes
CICO-TV-96	Hawkesbury	48 (UHF)	10 kW	100 m	45°30′7″N 74°41′16″W	
CICA-TV-13	Huntsville	13 (VHF)	31.9 kW	181.7 m	45°15′46″N 79°21′45″W	
CICE-TV-11	Parry Sound	42 (UHF)	7.57 kW	107.1 m	45°23′24″N 80°2′20″W	
CICA-TV-6	North Bay	6 (VHF)	95 kW	203.3 m	46°3′46″N 79°26′4″W	
CICO-TV-20	Sault Ste. Marie	20 (UHF)	6.1 kW	198.1 m	46°35′42″N 84°21′3″W	

==== High-power transmitters ====
Station	City of licence	Channel	ERP	HAAT	Transmitter coordinates	CRTC Decision/Notes
CICO-TV-93	McArthur's Mills (Bancroft)	42 (UHF)	140.6 kW	149.4 m	45°5′18″N 77°38′49″W	87-510
CICO-TV-91	Kenora	44 (UHF)	123.03 kW	157.8 m	49°42′8″N 94°47′15″W	
CICO-TV-38	Kingston	38 (UHF)	171.79 kW	180.4 m	44°17′25″N 76°28′42″W	
CICA-TV-12	Owen Sound	12 (VHF)	125 kW	134 m	44°26′39″N 81°2′37″W	
CICE-TV-16	Pembroke	29 (UHF)	119.4 kW	188 m	45°50′2″N 77°9′49″W	
CICA-TV-51	Penetanguishene	51 (UHF)	136.8 kW	184.7 m	44°46′10″N 79°59′24″W	
CICO-TV-74	Peterborough	18 (UHF)	781.62 kW	284.4 m	44°7′15″N 78°8′10″W	
CICO-TV-19	Sudbury	19 (UHF)	285 kW	171.9 m	46°25′29″N 81°0′53″W	
CICA-TV-7	Timmins	7 (VHF)	141.3 kW	197.7 m	48°28′12″N 81°17′49″W	

=== Carriage dispute ===
On June 6, 2012, TVO dropped its signal from cable and satellite providers outside Ontario, due to a carriage dispute over compensation for distributing its signal to its subscribers outside the province. The network reached an agreement with Vidéotron, and then entered negotiations with Shaw Communications and Telus, but failed to reach an agreement with Bell Canada. TVO cited that: "...we believe that we have a responsibility to earn revenues from the sale of our service outside of our home province. TVO is willing to consent to cable and satellite distributors carrying our signal outside the province, provided that we're fairly compensated. Since cable or satellite distributors receive subscriber revenues driven by having TVO as part of their offering, we feel it's reasonable to be compensated. Unfortunately, we could not come to an agreement with Bell to compensate TVO for carrying our signal outside of Ontario, and the decision was made to cease offering our signal outside of Ontario." As a result, the only cable and satellite customers outside Ontario that can still view TVO are on the Quebec side of the Ottawa–Gatineau market.

It is unknown if the dispute or carriage restrictions also apply to the few cable systems in the United States that carry TVO.
