= Peter Herrndorf =

Canadian lawyer and businessman (1940–2023)

Peter Herrndorf OC OOnt
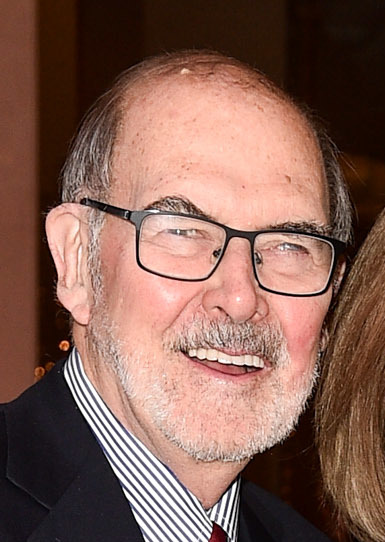
- Herrndorf at the 2018 CFC Annual Gala & Auction
- Born: October 27, 1940; Amsterdam, German-occupied Netherlands
- Died: February 18, 2023 (aged 82)
- Education: University of Manitoba; Dalhousie University; Harvard Business School
- Occupation: Performing arts executive
- Awards: Order of Canada; Order of Ontario

Peter A. Herrndorf CC OOnt (October 27, 1940 – February 18, 2023) was a Canadian lawyer and media businessman. He retired as the president and chief executive officer of the National Arts Centre on June 2, 2018.

Born in Amsterdam, Netherlands, he graduated with a BA in political science and English from the University of Manitoba in 1962 and a law degree from Dalhousie University in 1965. In 1970, he received an MBA from the Harvard Business School.

Herrndorf joined the Canadian Broadcasting Corporation (CBC) as a TV reporter/editor in Winnipeg beginning in 1965 a day after graduating from Dalhousie. Later that year, he moved to CBC Edmonton as a current affairs producer. In 1967, he transferred to Toronto as a producer of the network current affairs series The Way It Is. From 1974 to 1977, Herrndorf served as CBC's Head of TV Current Affairs Programming. In 1979, he became Special Assistant to the vice president and general manager of the CBC English network and served as vice president of English services from 1979 to 1983. He moved the nightly newscast The National from 11 o' clock to 10 and helped create a nightly public affairs program, The Journal.

Herrndorf was publisher of Toronto Life from 1983 to 1992, and was chairman and CEO of TVOntario from 1992 to 1999.

In 1993, he was made an Officer of the Order of Canada. He also received honorary Doctor of Laws degrees from York University in 1989, from the University of Winnipeg in 1993, and from Dalhousie University in 2000. In 1998, he was awarded the John Drainie Award. In 2007, he was awarded the Order of Ontario for having "revolutionized Canadian broadcasting, publishing and the performing arts at organizations such as the CBC, Toronto Life Magazine, TV Ontario and the National Arts Centre".

Herrndorf was appointed to the board of directors of the CBC in February, 2005 for a five-year term. He was also on the board of governors of the University of Ottawa.

On June 30, 2017, he was named a Companion of the Order of Canada by Governor General David Johnston for "his transformative leadership in Canada's artistic community and for his enduring commitment to building a thriving national arts scene."

In 2018, the City of Ottawa awarded Herrndorf the Key to the City.

Herrndorf was married to Eva Czigler and had two children, Katherine and Matthew. He died on February 18, 2023, at the age of 82.

| Preceded by Bernard Ostry | Chairman and CEO of TVOntario; 1992-1999 | Succeeded by Isabel Bassett |
