= Canadian Policy Research Networks =

Socio-economic think tank based in Ottawa, Canada

- Abbreviation: CPRN
- Formation: 1994; 32 years ago
- Dissolved: 2009; 17 years ago
- Type: Political and economic think tank based in Canada
- Legal status: Dissolved (Section 32(1) of the Canada Corporations Act)
- Purpose: Public policy research, deliberative dialogues and citizen engagement
- Headquarters: Ottawa, Ontario, Canada
- Region served: Canada
- Official language: English, French
- President: Dr. Sharon Manson Singer

Canadian Policy Research Networks (CPRN) was a non-profit, non-partisan socio-economic think tank based in Ottawa, Ontario, Canada, with a focus on citizen engagement and policy research and analysis.

== History ==
Founded in 1994, CPRN produced several hundred research documents on a wide variety of public policy issues, including citizenship; diversity and Canadian values; productivity and skills; health and an aging population; and the environment. CPRN also hosted the site JobQuality.ca which provided resources on the quality of jobs in Canada. CPRN produced more than 700 publications which touched on almost all the major socio-economic challenges facing Canada.

According to a federal government external evaluation from 2005, CPRN was "somewhat unique among [Canadian] think tanks" having developed expertise in health, work and social policy "with a special niche in the area of systematic public engagement". In Think Tanks Across Nations, the authors flag CPRN as having had an important interdisciplinary approach to policy research and state that this is "something which...few think tanks ever accomplish." Research from the Johnson-Shoyama Graduate School of Public Policy, University of Regina states that CPRN had "a major influence on Canadian social policy decision-makers" and was "responsive to the needs of decision-makers in producing policies capable of implementation within short time frames." They further note that CPRN was once Canada's most influential social policy think tank based on website visibility and influence.

In 2003, CPRN won Carleton University's Kroeger College Award in Public Discourse, in recognition of "excellence in contributing to the quality of public debate in Canada." Dr. Sharon Manson Singer was the most recent President of Canadian Policy Research Networks. The Founder and Past-President of CPRN was Judith Maxwell, who was formerly the Chair of the Economic Council of Canada.

On October 27, 2009 it was announced that CPRN would close its doors on December 23, 2009 after 15 years of public service, due to lack of government, private and other public funding resources.

On December 23, 2009, CPRN announced that Carleton University will now house the complete body of CPRN reports and publications in hard copy and all archival materials. The documents will be available for use to the general public, free of charge, at the university library. Carleton University also agreed to host and maintain the CPRN website for seven years after the closure date (to 2017) which will permit electronic access to 15-years of CPRN downloadable reports, free of charge. According to Roseann O'Reilly Runte, President of Carleton University,"Carleton has a long tradition as a leader in groundbreaking public policy research. Serving as the repository of the CPRN archive will guarantee that our students, researchers and the public continue to have access to the significant body of work undertaken by CPRN over the past 15 years."

== Select publications ==
- Charting the Course for Youth Civic and Political Participation Series
- The Vulnerable Workers Research Series
- Pathways to the Youth Labour Market Research Series
- Human Resource Issues in Canada's Non-profit Sector Series
- Citizens' Dialogue on the Kind of Canada We Want
- What's a Good Job — The Importance of Employment Relationships by Graham Lowe and Grant Schellenberg
- Too Many Left Behind by Patrice de Broucker
- How Canada Stacks Up: The Quality of Work – An International Perspective by Richard Brisbois
- 21st Century Job Quality: Achieving What Canadians Want by Graham Lowe
