= John Radford (broadcaster) =

Canadian broadcaster

John Radford is a Canadian broadcaster who briefly served as chairman of TVOntario.

Radford was private broadcaster owning radio stations in eastern Ontario. Radford had served on the board of TVOntario for nine years before being appointed the broadcaster's chairman of TVO in May 1985 by the short-lived Progressive Conservative government of Premier Frank Miller. Radford had links with the Conservative party having been a Tory organizer and manager of Jennifer Cossitt's campaign in a 1982 federal by-election. He was also a close friend of James Auld, a former Tory cabinet minister. Following the defeat of the Miller government, and its replacement by a new Liberal government led by David Peterson, Radford was fired in September 1985 and replaced by Bernard Ostry.

Preceded by Jim Parr	Chairman of TVOntario; 1985	Succeeded by Bernard Ostry
