= Thomas Ide =

Canadian television executive

- Born: Thomas Ranald Ide; February 20, 1919; Ottawa, Ontario, Canada
- Died: October 23, 1996 (aged 77)
- Occupations: teacher, public broadcasting executive
- Known for: Founding Chairman of TVOntario

Thomas Ranald "Ran" Ide, OC (February 20, 1919 – October 23, 1996) was a Canadian educator and the founding Chairman of TVOntario.

== Biography ==
Born in Ottawa, he received a degree in economics and served in the Royal Canadian Air Force during World War II.

Ide first got involved in broadcasting while he was a teenager in Saint John, New Brunswick and had an after school job doing movie reviews at a radio station.

After the war, he became a high school teacher in Port Arthur, Ontario and eventually became principal of Port Arthur Collegiate Institute and then, in 1965, superintendent of schools in the area.

In 1966, he was appointed director of educational television at the Ontario Ministry of Education by then Minister of Education Bill Davis. His unit bought air time from the Canadian Broadcasting Corporation and produced 150 programs in the first year. He helped create the Ontario Educational Communications Authority serving as its first chairman from 1970 to 1979. OECA launched its own television station in 1970, CICA, broadcasting from Toronto; by 1979 what had become TVOntario employed a staff of 400 and had transmitters across the province reaching 85% of Ontario's population and 88% of its schools.

Ide faced controversy in 1978 when he backed the production of The Jesus Trial, a series in which historical scholars staged a mock trial of Jews for the murder of Christ. The series was acclaimed by theologians and academics but was criticized by the Roman Catholic archdiocese in Toronto which pressured the provincial government to cancel the series. It aired but, the next year, the government of Bill Davis cut TVO's budget for the first time.

After retiring from TVO in 1979 Ide chaired the federal Department of Communications Research Advisory Board, the Science Council of Canada's Communications board and served as acting vice-president of planning at the Canadian Broadcasting Corporation.

In 1995, he was made an Officer of the Order of Canada. He died of leukemia in 1996. Former Premier Davis delivered a eulogy at Ide's memorial service.

| Preceded by None | Chairman of TVOntario; 1970-1979 | Succeeded by Jim Parr |
