= Lisa de Wilde =

Lisa de Wilde (born 1956) is a Canadian film and television executive, was the CEO of TVOntario from 2005 to 2019. She retired on October 30, 2019.

De Wilde previously worked at the CRTC for seven years before moving into the private sector and eventually rose to the rank of president and CEO of Astral Television Networks Inc.

She is a graduate of McGill University and is a member of the Law Society of Upper Canada. She sits on the executive committee of the Commonwealth Broadcasting Association.

She was named a Member of the Order of Canada in 2015.

De Wilde hails from Winnipeg, Manitoba, but moved to Montreal, Quebec at age 10 and proceeded to move to many different cities, across three provinces where she attended five different high schools.

Preceded by Isabel Bassett	CEO of TVOntario; 2005-2019	Succeeded by Jeffrey Orridge
