= Val O'Donovan =

Val O'Donovan CM

7th Chancellor of the University of Waterloo
- In office 1997–2003
- Preceded by: Sylvia Ostry
- Succeeded by: Mike Lazaridis
- President/Vice Chancellor: James Downey (1997-1999); David Johnston (1999-2003)

Personal details
- Born: Michael Valentine O'Donovan; February 14, 1936 Cork, Ireland
- Died: February 5, 2005 (aged 68) Bermuda

Michael Valentine (Val) O'Donovan, CM (February 14, 1936 – February 5, 2005) was a Canadian businessman and Chancellor of the University of Waterloo.

Born on Valentine's Day in 1936 in Cork, Ireland, to parents Patrick Joseph and Mary Imelda (née O'Donnell). He started working at Pye Telecommunications in 1959 after graduating as an electrical engineer from the Cambridge College of Technology. He invented a new type of microwavemultiplexer in 1962 and the paper he wrote about his work won the best paper award in the Journal of the Institution of Electronic and Radio Engineers. O'Donovan met his future wife Sheila (1937-2019 shortly after graduating from college. The couple were married in 1960. Together they had four children: Simon, Christopher, Stephen and Caroline.

In 1963, O'Donovan, immigrated to Canada with Sheila, then pregnant, and their two young sons, where he worked in RCA's communications division in Montreal. By 1971, he was manager of RCA's satellite transponder department, which was responsible for designing the payloads used in the innovative Canada/United States communications technology satellite and the first domestic United States satellites. Drawing on his expertise, he co-authored a book (with Chandra Kudsia) titled Microwave Filters for Communications Systems. After working in the satellite division at RCA in Montreal, Val, with two partners, founded COM DEV in 1972 and, under his guidance, it became a global leader in satellite communications technology. On Halloween in 1979, COM DEV, along with 44 families, moved to Cambridge, Ontario. Under Val's leadership COM DEV continued to thrive, and in 1996 became a publicly listed company (symbol CDV on the Toronto Stock Exchange). In 1998, O'Donovan retired as CEO of COM DEV but continued on as chairman of the board until December 2004.

In 1992, O'Donovan was awarded the McNaughton Gold Medal by the Institution of Electrical and Electronic Engineers. In 1993, he received the Laurier Outstanding Business Leader Award from Wilfrid Laurier University. In 1995, the University of Waterloo awarded him the degree of Doctor of Engineering (Honoris Causa). In 2001, Val was awarded with the John H. Chapman Award from the Canadian Space Agency. In 2003, O'Donovan was made a Member of the Order of Canada, Canada's highest civilian honour.

From 1997 to 2003, O'Donovan was Chancellor at the University of Waterloo, where he relished giving degrees to many thousands of students, to each of whom he had something special to say.

In 1998, O'Donovan and Sheila started a charitable foundation to establish a residential hospice in Waterloo Region for terminally ill cancer patients. In July 2000, Lisaard House (lisaardandinnisfree.com) was open for its first residents.

O'Donovan's special interests included his rose garden, his bookshelves and his wine cellar.

On February 5, 2005, O'Donovan died at his home in Bermuda.

== See also ==
- List of University of Waterloo people

Academic offices
Preceded by Sylvia Ostry	Chancellor of the University of Waterloo; 1997–2003	Succeeded by Mike Lazaridis
