= Jonathan D. Ostry =

Professor of Economics, Global Affairs and Public Policy at the University of Toronto

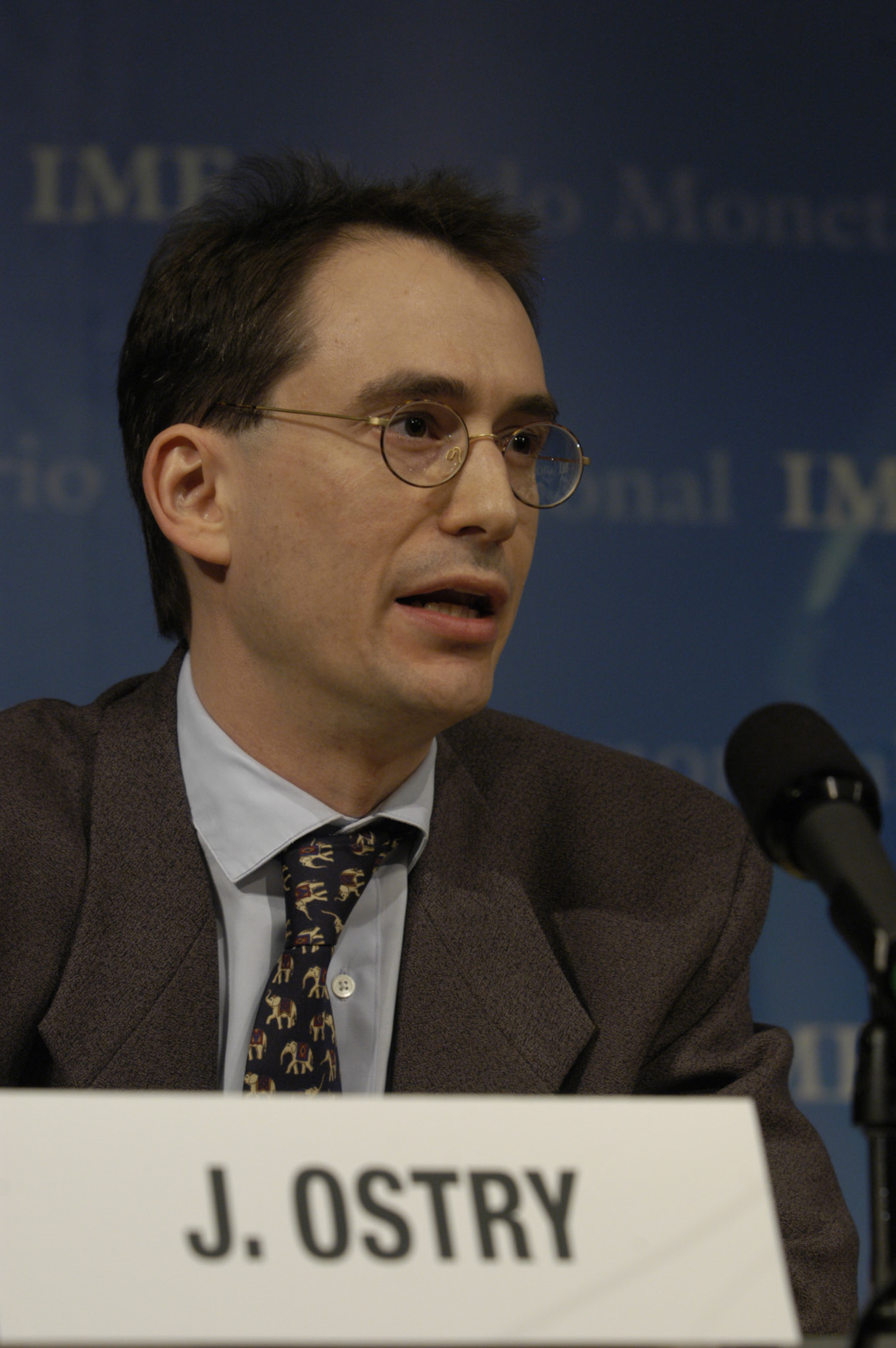
- Born: July 29, 1962 (age 64)

Academic background
- Education: Oxford University; London School of Economics; University of Chicago

Academic work
- Discipline: International economics
- Institutions: International Monetary Fund
- Website: Information at IDEAS / RePEc

Jonathan David Ostry is Professor of Economics, Global Affairs and Public Policy at the University of Toronto, cross-appointed to the Munk School of Global Affairs & Public Policy and the Department of Economics. Prior to his appointment to the University of Toronto faculty, Ostry served as Professor of the Practice in the Department of Economics at Georgetown University. Ostry is also a Research Fellow at the Centre for Economic Policy Research (CEPR) in London, England, and a Non-Resident Research Fellow at Bruegel in Brussels. Prior to his academic appointments, Ostry served in senior roles for more than three decades at the International Monetary Fund (IMF) in Washington DC, including as Deputy Director of the Research Department and Acting Director of the Asia and Pacific Department.

Ostry's recent work has focused on the management of international capital flows, in particular the role of capital controls; this work has been influential in bringing about a shift in the institutional position of the IMF on capital controls. Ostry has also published influential studies on the relationship between income inequality and economic growth, where his work—which has featured prominently in the financial press—suggests that high income inequality and a failure to sustain economic growth may be two sides of the same coin. His other work focuses on fiscal sustainability issues (especially the role of a country’s track record of fiscal management in enabling it to access the international capital markets). Ostry has many distinguished academic publications, and his work has been cited widely in scholarly journals, and in the press, including The Economist, the Financial Times, The Wall Street Journal, The New York Times and The Washington Post. Ostry was listed in Who’s Who in Economics in 2003. He was named one of the 100 most powerful people in global finance by Worth magazine in 2016, and as one of the economists whose research shaped the world in 2017.

== Early career ==
Ostry received a B.A. (with Distinction) from Queen’s University (Canada), where he was an Undergraduate Medallist, at the age of 18. He then went on to do another B.A. at Oxford University (Balliol College) as a Commonwealth Scholar in Philosophy, Politics and Economics, followed by an M.Sc. at the London School of Economics. He earned his Ph.D. in Economics at the University of Chicago, where he was a Mackenzie King Fellow, Social Sciences and Humanities Research Council Doctoral Fellow, and Pew Fellow. He has held several senior positions at the IMF, including leading country teams on Japan and several Asian countries, and leading the team that produces the IMF’s flagship World Economic Outlook. At the IMF, Ostry has led work on global systemic macrofinancial risks, including as a member of the advisory board of the World Economic Forum's Global Risk Report.

== Research and publication ==
Ostry’s work covers various aspects of domestic and international macroeconomic policy, including exchange rate regimes, capital controls, fiscal space, and income inequality. He has written several books on international economic matters, most recently Taming the Tide of Capital Flows (MIT Press, 2018) and Confronting Inequality (Columbia University Press, 2019). He has published numerous articles in scholarly journals, such as the American Economic Review, the Economic Journal, the IMF Economic Review, the Journal of Monetary Economics, the Journal of International Economics, the Journal of Development Economics, among others. His work has featured extensively in the press, including in The Economist, the Financial Times, The New York Times, The Wall Street Journal, The Guardian, The Independent, The Washington Post, Bloomberg, Business Week, Forbes, Time magazine, Les Échos, Fortune, BBC, CNBC, National Public Radio, Maclean's, and HBO's Last Week Tonight show. His work has been cited in remarks made by, among others, US President Barack Obama, Fed Chairman Ben Bernanke, US Council of Economic Advisers Chairman Jason Furman, and IMF Managing Director Christine Lagarde.

Ostry is involved in efforts to raise awareness of inequality issues at the global level, including through his membership in the World Economic Forum's Global Agenda Councils on new growth models and inclusive growth, and through his writings on the impact of neoliberal policies, which have received widespread media attention. His work on inequality and debt sustainability is being used by credit rating agencies (S&P, Moody's) for their credit rating analysis.

== Personal information ==
Ostry was born in Ottawa, Canada. He is the son of Sylvia Ostry and Bernard Ostry.
