= Bernard Ostry =

Canadian civil servant (1927–2006)

- Born: June 10, 1927; Wadena, Saskatchewan
- Died: May 24, 2006 (aged 78); Toronto, Ontario
- Education: London School of Economics, University of Manitoba
- Known for: Chair and CEO of TVOntario
- Spouse: Sylvia Ostry
- Awards: Order of Canada

Bernard A. Ostry, CC (June 10, 1927 – May 24, 2006) was a Canadian author, philanthropist, and civil servant, who is best known for being chair and CEO of TVOntario.

Born in Wadena, Saskatchewan, he received a Bachelor of Arts degree from the University of Manitoba in 1948. From 1948 to 1952, he did post-graduate work in the field of international history at the London School of Economics (LSE) under the Cambridge historian Charles Webster. From 1951 to 1955, he was a research associate for the Faculty of Social Sciences at the University of Birmingham. As well, from 1951 to 1952, he was a Special Assistant and Advisor to the Leader of the Indian delegation to the United Nations. From 1956 to 1958, he was the David Davies Fellow in International History at the LSE.

In 1955 Ostry co-authored with historian H S Ferns the critical biography of Canadian prime minister William Lyon Mackenzie King, The Age of Mackenzie King: The Rise of the Leader. The book was supposed to be the first of a multi-volume biography of the former prime minister but the co-authors fell out in the process of writing and publishing the book. When it was published The Age of Mackenzie King created a minor controversy because of its critical tone. In February 1956 there were allegations that the federal Liberal government had censored public discussion of the book.

Leaving academics, he served as the Secretary-Treasurer for the Commonwealth Institute of Social Research from 1959 to 1961. He returned to Canada in 1961 to become Secretary-Treasurer for the Social Sciences Research Council of Canada, a position which he held until 1963.

Changing careers again, he became a moderator for the CBC program Nightline from 1960 to 1963. From 1963 to 1968, he was a supervisor in the Department of Public Affairs (Radio & TV) at the CBC. From 1968 to 1969, he served as the Chief Consultant to the Canadian Radio Television Commission. Next, from 1968 to 1970, he was the Commissioner for the Prime Minister Pierre Trudeau's Task Force on Government Information.

From 1970 to 1973, he was the Assistant Under Secretary of State (Citizenship). From 1974 to 1981, he was the Deputy Minister for various provincial and federal ministries including National Museums of Canada, Communications, Industry & Tourism, Industry & Trade, and Citizenship & Culture. From 1981 to 1985 he was a deputy minister in the Bill Davis government in Ontario variously as deputy minister of industry and trade, deputy minister of industry and tourism and then deputy minister of citizenship and culture.

In 1985, Premier David Peterson appointed Ostry to the position of chairman and CEO of TVOntario. Ostry retired from TVO in 1992.

In 1988, he was made an Officer of the Order of Canada for being "an outspoken advocate of cultural sovereignty, ethics in the public service and the preservation of public broadcasting". He was promoted to Companion in 2006. He has received honorary degrees from University of Manitoba, University of Waterloo, and York University.

He married Sylvia Ostry. They had two children: Adam Ostry (a senior federal civil servant himself) and Jonathan D. Ostry (Deputy Director, Research Department, International Monetary Fund). He died in Toronto of prostate cancer, aged 78.

Preceded by John Radford	Chairman and CEO of TVOntario; 1985-1991	Succeeded by Peter Herrndorf
