= Sylvia Ostry =

Canadian economist (1927–2020)

Sylvia Ostry CC OM FRSC

6th Chancellor of the University of Waterloo
- In office 1991–1997
- Preceded by: J. Page Wadsworth
- Succeeded by: Val O'Donovan
- President/Vice Chancellor: Douglas T. Wright (1991-1993); James Downey (1993-1999)

Personal details
- Born: Sylvia Knelman; June 3, 1927 Winnipeg, Manitoba
- Died: May 7, 2020 (aged 92) Toronto, Ontario
- Spouse(s): Henry Isidore Wiseman, Bernard Ostry
- Education: University of Cambridge, Girton College, McGill University
- Occupation: Economist and Civil Servant
- Awards: Order of Canada; Order of Manitoba

Sylvia Ostry CC OM FRSC (née Knelman; June 3, 1927 – May 7, 2020) was a Canadian economist and public servant.

== Life ==
Born Sylvia Knelman in Winnipeg, Manitoba on June 3, 1927, she received a Bachelor of Arts in economics from McGill University in 1948, a Master of Arts from McGill in 1950, and eventually earned her PhD from Girton College, Cambridge in 1954.

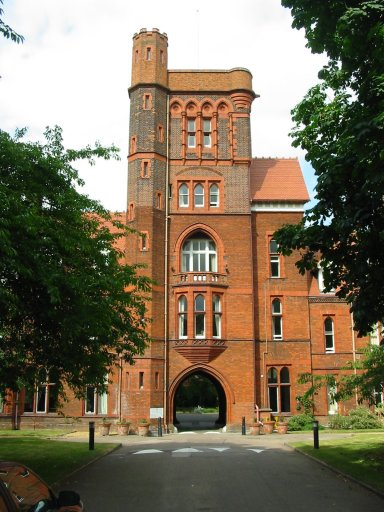
Girton College, University of Cambridge

After studying at the University of Cambridge, she was a lecturer at McGill, becoming an assistant professor from 1952 to 1955, and becoming Associate Professor at the Université de Montréal from 1962 to 1964. From 1972 to 1975, Ostry was Chief Statistician of Canada at Statistics Canada. From 1975 to 1978, Ostry was Deputy Minister, Consumer and Corporate Affairs. From 1978 to 1979, she was Chairman, Economic Council of Canada. From 1979 to 1983, she was Head of the Department of Economics and Statistics of the Organisation for Economic Co-operation and Development, Paris. From 1984 to 1985 she was Deputy Minister, International Trade, and Coordinator, International Economic Relations. Later, in 1986 Ostry became a member of the influential Washington-based financial advisory body, the Group of Thirty. During the 1988 G7 Summit in Toronto, Ostry served as Canada's sherpa.

From 1991 to 1996, she was Chancellor, University of Waterloo. In 1997 she was appointed Chancellor Emerita, University of Waterloo.

From 1990 to 1997, she was Chair of the University of Toronto's Centre for International Studies. Since then she has been a Distinguished Research Fellow there.

She was married to the late Bernard Ostry, with whom she had two children, Adam Ostry (a senior federal civil servant himself) and Jonathan D. Ostry (Deputy Director, Research Department, International Monetary Fund). She died in Toronto on Thursday May 7, 2020.

== Awards ==
- In 1972 she was elected as a Fellow of the American Statistical Association
- In 1978 she was made an Officer of the Order of Canada
- In 1987 she received the Government of Canada Outstanding Achievement Award
- In 1990 she was promoted to Companion of the Order of Canada.
- In 1991 she was made a Fellow of the Royal Society of Canada
- In 2009 she was made a Member of the Order of Manitoba.
- In 2010 she was awarded The Couchiching Award for Public Policy Leadership

== Honours ==
- Ostry was awarded 18 honorary Doctorate of Laws degrees from:
  - University of New Brunswick in 1971
  - York University in 1971
  - McGill University in 1972
  - University of Western Ontario in 1973
  - McMaster University in 1973
  - University of British Columbia in 1973
  - Queen's University in 1975
  - Brock University in 1975
  - Mount Allison University in 1975
  - Acadia University in 1981
  - American College of Switzerland in 1983
  - University of Winnipeg in 1984
  - University of Manitoba in 1986
  - Concordia University (Montreal) in 1986
  - University of Windsor in 1987
  - University of Waterloo in 1997
  - a Doctorate of Management Sciences from University of Ottawa in 1976
  - a Doctorate of Letters from Laurentian University in 1977

=== Sylvia Ostry Foundation ===
The Sylvia Ostry Foundation was established in April 1991, by several of Ostry's Canadian friends and admirers. The foundation had the objective of establishing an annual or biennial lecture in Canada on a subject related to the global economic and financial system. The lectureship was modelled on the Per Jacobsson lectures in Washington, which were established in 1964.

The inaugural lecture was given in Ottawa in May 1993 by Japanese diplomat Sadako Ogata; at the time Ogata was head of the United Nations High Commissioner for Refugees (UNHCR).

The first six Sylvia Ostry Foundation lectures were collected and published in 2003. The lecturers were Sadako Ogata, Jacques Delors, Michel Camdessus, Renato Ruggiero, Enrique V. Iglesias, and Paul Volcker.

== Select publications ==
- Summitry: The Medium and the Message. Bissell Paper No. 3. Toronto: University of Toronto, Centre for International Studies, 1988
- Canada, Europe and the Economic Summits. Paper presented at the All-European Canadian Studies Conference, The Hague, October 24–27, 1990. Unpublished in print
- Globalization and the G8: could Kananaskis set a new direction?. O.D. Skelton Memorial Lecture, Queen's University, March 2002. Unpublished in print

== See also ==
- List of University of Waterloo people
- Sylvia Ostry; Bronwyn Bragg; Mary Breen (2008-05-28). "Archives and Special Collections - Sylvia Ostry interview". University of Ottawa.

Academic offices
Preceded by J. Page Wadsworth	Chancellor of the University of Waterloo; 1991–1997	Succeeded by Val O'Donovan
