= List of census subdivisions in Ontario =

The following is a list of census subdivisions in the Canadian province of Ontario.

- Key
  - C = City
  - R = First Nations Reserve
  - S-E = Indian Settlement
  - T = Town
  - TP = Township
  - UNO = Unorganized
  - VL = Village

== A ==
- Abitibi 70 R
- Addington Highlands TP
- Adelaide Metcalfe TP
- Adjala-Tosorontio TP
- Admaston/Bromley TP
- Agency 1 R
- Ajax T
- Akwesasne (Part) 59 R
- Alberton TP
- Alderville First Nation R
- Alfred and Plantagenet TP
- Algoma, Unorganized, North Part UNO
- Algoma, Unorganized, South East Part UNO
- Algonquin Highlands TP
- Almonte T
- Alnwick/Haldimand TP
- Amaranth TP
- Amherstburg T
- The Archipelago TP
- Armour TP
- Armstrong TP
- Arnprior T
- Aroland 83 R
- Arran-Elderslie
- Ashfield-Colborne-Wawanosh TP
- Asphodel-Norwood TP
- Assiginack TP
- Athens TP
- Atikokan TP
- Attawapiskat 91A R
- Augusta TP
- Aurora T
- Aylmer T

== B ==
- Baldwin, Ontario TP
- Bancroft, Ontario T
- Barrie, Ontario C
- Bayham, Ontario TP
- Bear Island 1, Ontario R
- Bearskin Lake, Ontario R
- Beckwith, Ontario TP
- Belleville, Ontario C
- Big Grassy River 35G, Ontario R
- Big Island Mainland 93, Ontario R
- Billings, Ontario TP
- Black River-Matheson, Ontario TP
- Blandford-Blenheim, Ontario TP
- Blind River, Ontario T
- The Blue Mountains, Ontario T
- Bluewater, Ontario T
- Bonfield, Ontario TP
- Bonnechere Valley, Ontario TP
- Bracebridge, Ontario T
- Bradford West Gwillimbury, Ontario T
- Brampton, Ontario C
- Brant, Ontario C
- Brantford, Ontario C
- Brethour, Ontario TP
- Brighton, Ontario T
- Brock, Ontario TP
- Brockton, Ontario TP
- Brockville, Ontario C
- Brooke-Alvinston, Ontario TP
- Bruce Mines, Ontario T
- Brudenell, Lyndoch and Raglan, Ontario TP
- Burk's Falls, Ontario VL
- Burlington, Ontario C
- Burpee and Mills, Ontario TP

== C ==
- Caledon, Ontario T
- Callander, Ontario TP
- Calvin, Ontario TP
- Cambridge, Ontario C
- Carleton Place, Ontario T
- Carling, Ontario TP
- Carlow/Mayo, Ontario TP
- Casey, Ontario TP
- Casselman, Ontario VL
- Cat Lake 63C, Ontario R
- Cavan-Monaghan, Ontario TP
- Central Elgin, Ontario TP
- Central Frontenac, Ontario TP
- Central Huron, Ontario TP
- Central Manitoulin, Ontario TP
- Centre Hastings, Ontario TP
- Centre Wellington, Ontario TP
- Chamberlain, Ontario TP
- Champlain, Ontario TP
- Chapleau, Ontario TP
- Chapleau 74A, Ontario R
- Chapleau 75, Ontario R
- Chapple, Ontario TP
- Charlton and Dack, Ontario TP
- Chatham-Kent, Ontario C
- Chatsworth, Ontario TP
- Chippewas of Georgina Island First Nation, Ontario R
- Chippewas of the Thames First Nation 42, Ontario R
- Chisholm, Ontario TP
- Christian Island 30, Ontario R
- Christian Island 30A, Ontario R
- Clarence-Rockland, Ontario C
- Clarington, Ontario T
- Clearview, Ontario TP
- Cobalt, Ontario T
- Cobourg, Ontario T
- Cochrane, Ontario T
- Cochrane, Unorganized, North Part, Ontario UNO
- Cochrane, Unorganized, South East Part, Ontario UNO
- Cochrane, Unorganized, South West Part, Ontario UNO
- Cockburn Island, Ontario TP
- Coleman, Ontario TP
- Collingwood, Ontario T
- Conmee, Ontario TP
- Constance Lake 92, Ontario R
- Cornwall, Ontario C
- Couchiching 16A, Ontario R
- Cramahe, Ontario TP
- Curve Lake First Nation 35, Ontario R

== D ==
- The Dalles 38C R
- Dawn-Euphemia TP
- Dawson TP
- Deep River T
- Deer Lake R
- Deseronto T
- Dokis 9 R
- Dorion TP
- Douro-Dummer TP
- Drummond/North Elmsley TP
- Dryden C
- Dubreuilville TP
- Duck Lake 76B R
- Dutton/Dunwich TP
- Dysart and Others TP

== E ==
- Eagle Lake 27, Ontario R
- Ear Falls, Ontario TP
- East Ferris, Ontario TP
- East Garafraxa, Ontario TP
- East Gwillimbury, Ontario T
- East Hawkesbury, Ontario TP
- East Luther Grand Valley, Ontario TP
- East Zorra-Tavistock, Ontario TP
- Edwardsburgh/Cardinal, Ontario TP
- Elizabethtown-Kitley, Ontario TP
- Elliot Lake C
- Emo, Ontario TP
- Englehart, Ontario T
- English River 21, Ontario R
- Enniskillen, Ontario TP
- Erin, Ontario T
- Espanola, Ontario T
- Essa, Ontario TP
- Essex, Ontario T
- Evanturel, Ontario TP

== F ==
- Factory Island 1, Ontario R
- Faraday, Ontario TP
- Fauquier-Strickland, Ontario TP
- Flying Post 73, Ontario R
- Fort Albany (Part) 67, Ontario R
- Fort Erie, Ontario T
- Fort Frances, Ontario T
- Fort Hope 64, Ontario R
- Fort Severn 89, Ontario R
- Fort William 52, Ontario R
- French River T
- French River 13, Ontario R
- Front of Yonge, Ontario TP
- Frontenac Islands, Ontario TP

== G ==
- Gananoque T
- Garden River R
- Gauthier TP
- Georgian Bay TP
- Georgian Bluffs TP
- Georgina T
- Gillies TP
- Ginoogaming First Nation R
- Goderich T
- Gordon/Barrie Island TP
- Gore Bay T
- Goulais Bay R
- Gravenhurst T
- Greater Madawaska TP
- Greater Napanee T
- Greater Sudbury C
- Greenstone T
- Grey Highlands TP
- Grimsby T
- Gros Cap R
- Guelph C
- Guelph/Eramosa TP
- Gull River R

== H ==
- Haldimand, Ontario C
- Halton Hills, Ontario T
- Hamilton, Ontario C
- Hamilton, Ontario (township) TP
- Hanover, Ontario T
- Harley, Ontario TP
- Harris, Ontario TP
- Hastings Highlands, Ontario TP
- Havelock-Belmont-Methuen, Ontario TP
- Hawkesbury, Ontario T
- Head, Clara and Maria, Ontario TP
- Hearst, Ontario T
- Henvey Inlet 2, Ontario R
- Hiawatha First Nation R
- Highlands East, Ontario TP
- Hilliard, Ontario TP
- Hilton, Ontario TP
- Hilton Beach, Ontario VL
- Hornepayne, Ontario TP
- Horton, Ontario TP
- Howick, Ontario TP
- Hudson, Ontario TP
- Huntsville, Ontario T
- Huron East, Ontario T
- Huron Shores, Ontario TP
- Huron-Kinloss, Ontario TP

== I ==
- Ignace, Ontario TP
- Ingersoll, Ontario T
- Innisfil, Ontario T
- Iroquois Falls, Ontario T
- Islington 29, Ontario R

== J ==
- James, Ontario TP
- Jocelyn, Ontario TP
- Johnson, Ontario TP
- Joly, Ontario TP

== K ==
- Kapuskasing, Ontario T
- Kasabonika Lake, Ontario R
- Kawartha Lakes, Ontario C
- Kearney, Ontario T
- Keewaywin, Ontario R
- Kenora, Ontario C
- Kenora 38B, Ontario R
- Kenora, Unorganized, Ontario UNO
- Kerns, Ontario TP
- Kettle Point 44, Ontario R
- Killaloe, Hagarty and Richards, Ontario TP
- Killarney, Ontario T
- Kincardine, Ontario TP
- King, Ontario TP
- Kingfisher Lake 1, Ontario R
- Kingston, Ontario C
- Kingsville, Ontario T
- Kirkland Lake, Ontario T
- Kitchener, Ontario C
- Kitchenuhmaykoosib Aaki 84 (Big Trout Lake), Ontario R

== L ==
- La Vallee, Ontario TP
- LaSalle, Ontario T
- Lac Seul 28, Ontario R
- Lac des Mille Lacs 22A1, Ontario R
- Laird, Ontario TP
- Lake Helen 53A, Ontario R
- Lake of Bays, Ontario TP
- Lake of the Woods, Ontario TP
- Lake of the Woods 31G, Ontario R
- Lake of the Woods 37, Ontario R
- Lakeshore, Ontario T
- Lambton Shores, Ontario C
- Lanark Highlands, Ontario TP
- Lansdowne House, Ontario S-E
- Larder Lake, Ontario TP
- Latchford, Ontario T
- Laurentian Hills, Ontario T
- Laurentian Valley, Ontario TP
- Leamington, Ontario T
- Leeds and the Thousand Islands, Ontario TP
- Limerick, Ontario TP
- Lincoln, Ontario T
- London, Ontario C
- Long Lake 58, Ontario R
- Long Sault 12, Ontario R
- Loyalist, Ontario TP
- Lucan Biddulph, Ontario TP

== M ==
- M'Chigeeng 22 (West Bay 22), Ontario R
- MacDowell Lake, Ontario S-E
- Macdonald, Meredith and Aberdeen Additional, Ontario TP
- Machar, Ontario TP
- Machin, Ontario TP
- Madawaska Valley, Ontario TP
- Madoc, Ontario TP
- Magnetawan, Ontario TP
- Magnetawan 1, Ontario R
- Malahide, Ontario TP
- Manitou Rapids 11, Ontario R
- Manitoulin, Unorganized, Mainland, Ontario UNO
- Manitoulin, Unorganized, West Part, Ontario UNO
- Manitouwadge, Ontario TP
- Mapleton, Ontario TP
- Marathon, Ontario T
- Markham, Ontario T
- Markstay-Warren, Ontario T
- Marmora and Lake, Ontario TP
- Marten Falls 65, Ontario R
- Matachewan, Ontario TP
- Matachewan 72, Ontario R
- Mattagami 71, Ontario R
- Mattawa, Ontario T
- Mattawan, Ontario TP
- Mattice-Val Côté, Ontario TP
- McDougall, Ontario TP
- McGarry, Ontario TP
- McKellar, Ontario TP
- McMurrich/Monteith, Ontario TP
- McNab/Braeside, Ontario TP
- Meaford, Ontario T
- Melancthon, Ontario TP
- Merrickville-Wolford, Ontario VL
- Middlesex Centre, Ontario TP
- Midland, Ontario T
- Milton, Ontario T
- Minden Hills, Ontario TP
- Minto, Ontario T
- Missanabie 62, Ontario R
- Mississagi River 8, Ontario R
- Mississauga, Ontario C
- Mississaugas of Scugog Island, Ontario R
- Mnjikaning First Nation 32 (Rama First Nation 32), Ontario R
- Mono, Ontario T
- Montague, Ontario TP
- Moonbeam, Ontario TP
- Moose Factory 68, Ontario R
- Moose Point 79, Ontario R
- Moosonee, Ontario T
- Moravian 47, Ontario R
- Morley, Ontario TP
- Morris-Turnberry, Ontario TP
- Mountbatten 76A, Ontario R
- Mulmur, Ontario TP
- Munsee-Delaware Nation 1, Ontario R
- Muskoka Lakes, Ontario TP
- Muskrat Dam Lake, Ontario R

== N ==
- Nairn and Hyman, Ontario TP
- Naiscoutaing 17A, Ontario R
- The Nation TP
- Neebing, Ontario TP
- Neguaguon Lake 25D, Ontario R
- Neskantaga, Ontario R
- New Credit (Part) 40A, Ontario R
- New Post 69, Ontario R
- New Post 69A, Ontario R
- New Tecumseth, Ontario T
- Newbury, Ontario VL
- Newmarket, Ontario T
- Neyaashiinigmiing, Ontario R
- Niagara Falls, Ontario C
- Niagara-on-the-Lake, Ontario T
- Nipigon, Ontario TP
- Nipissing, Ontario TP
- Nipissing 10, Ontario R
- Nipissing, Unorganized, North Part, Ontario UNO
- Nipissing, Unorganized, South Part, Ontario UNO
- Norfolk, Ontario C
- North Algona-Wilberforce, Ontario TP
- North Bay, Ontario C
- North Dumfries, Ontario TP
- North Dundas, Ontario TP
- North Frontenac, Ontario TP
- North Glengarry, Ontario TP
- North Grenville, Ontario TP
- North Huron, Ontario TP
- North Kawartha, Ontario TP
- North Middlesex, Ontario TP
- North Perth, Ontario T
- North Shore, Ontario TP
- North Spirit Lake, Ontario R
- North Stormont, Ontario TP
- Northeastern Manitoulin and the Islands, Ontario T
- Northern Bruce Peninsula, Ontario TP
- Northwest Angle 33B, Ontario R
- Norwich, Ontario TP

== O ==
- O'Connor, Ontario TP
- Oakville, Ontario T
- Oil Springs, Ontario VL
- Ojibway Nation of Saugeen (Savant Lake), Ontario R
- Oliver Paipoonge, Ontario TP
- Oneida 41, Ontario R
- Opasatika, Ontario TP
- Orangeville, Ontario T
- Orillia, Ontario C
- Oro-Medonte, Ontario TP
- Oshawa, Ontario C
- Osnaburgh 63A, Ontario R
- Osnaburgh 63B, Ontario R
- Otonabee-South Monaghan, Ontario TP
- Ottawa, Ontario C
- Owen Sound, Ontario C

== P ==
- Pakenham, Ontario VL
- Papineau-Cameron, Ontario TP
- Parry Island First Nation, Ontario R
- Parry Sound, Ontario T
- Parry Sound, Unorganized, Centre Part, Ontario UNO
- Parry Sound, Unorganized, North East Part, Ontario UNO
- Pays Plat 51, Ontario R
- Peawanuck, Ontario S-E
- Pelee, Ontario TP
- Pelham, Ontario T
- Pembroke, Ontario C
- Penetanguishene, Ontario T
- Perry, Ontario TP
- Perth, Ontario T
- Perth East, Ontario TP
- Perth South, Ontario TP
- Petawawa, Ontario T
- Peterborough, Ontario C
- Petrolia, Ontario T
- Pic Mobert North, Ontario R
- Pic Mobert South, Ontario R
- Pic River 50, Ontario R
- Pickering, Ontario C
- Pickle Lake, Ontario TP
- Pikangikum 14, Ontario R
- Pikwakanagan (Golden Lake 39), Ontario R
- Plummer Additional, Ontario TP
- Plympton-Wyoming, Ontario T
- Point Edward, Ontario VL
- Poplar Hill, Ontario R
- Port Colborne, Ontario C
- Port Hope, Ontario T
- Powassan, Ontario T
- Prescott, Ontario T
- Prince, Ontario TP
- Prince Edward, Ontario C
- Puslinch, Ontario TP

== Q ==
- Quinte West, Ontario C

== R ==
- Rainy Lake 17A, Ontario R
- Rainy Lake 17B, Ontario R
- Rainy Lake 18C, Ontario R
- Rainy Lake 26A, Ontario R
- Rainy River, Ontario T
- Rainy River, Unorganized, Ontario UNO
- Ramara, Ontario TP
- Rankin Location 15D, Ontario R
- Rat Portage 38A, Ontario R
- Red Lake, Ontario T
- Red Rock, Ontario TP
- Renfrew, Ontario T
- Richmond Hill, Ontario T
- Rideau Lakes, Ontario TP
- Rocky Bay 1, Ontario R
- Russell, Ontario TP
- Ryerson, Ontario TP

== S ==
- Sabaskong Bay 35D, Ontario R
- Sables-Spanish Rivers, Ontario TP
- Sachigo Lake 1, Ontario R
- Sachigo Lake 2, Ontario R
- Sagamok, Ontario R
- Sandy Lake 88, Ontario R
- Sarnia, Ontario C
- Sarnia 45, Ontario R
- Saug-a-Gaw-Sing 1, Ontario R
- Saugeen 29, Ontario R
- Saugeen Shores, Ontario T
- Sault Ste. Marie, Ontario C
- Schreiber, Ontario TP
- Scugog, Ontario TP
- Seguin, Ontario TP
- Seine River 22A2, Ontario R
- Seine River 23A, Ontario R
- Seine River 23B, Ontario R
- Selwyn, Ontario TP
- Serpent River 7, Ontario R
- Severn, Ontario TP
- Shawanaga 17, Ontario R
- Sheguiandah 24, Ontario R
- Shelburne, Ontario T
- Sheshegwaning 20, Ontario R
- Shoal Lake (Part) 39A, Ontario R
- Shoal Lake (Part) 40, Ontario R
- Shoal Lake 34B2, Ontario R
- Shuniah, Ontario TP
- Sioux Lookout, Ontario T
- Sioux Narrows-Nestor Falls, Ontario TP
- Six Nations 40, Ontario R
- Slate Falls, Ontario S-E
- Smiths Falls, Ontario T
- Smooth Rock Falls, Ontario T
- South Algonquin, Ontario TP
- South Bruce, Ontario TP
- South Bruce Peninsula, Ontario T
- South Dundas, Ontario TP
- South Frontenac, Ontario TP
- South Glengarry, Ontario TP
- South Huron, Ontario T
- South River, Ontario VL
- South Stormont, Ontario TP
- South-West Oxford, Ontario TP
- Southgate, Ontario TP
- Southwest Middlesex, Ontario TP
- Southwold, Ontario TP
- Spanish, Ontario T
- Springwater, Ontario TP
- St. Catharines, Ontario C
- St. Clair, Ontario TP
- St. Joseph, Ontario TP
- St. Marys, Ontario T
- St. Thomas, Ontario C
- St.-Charles, Ontario T
- Stirling-Rawdon, Ontario TP
- Stone Mills, Ontario TP
- Stratford, Ontario C
- Strathroy-Caradoc, Ontario TP
- Strong, Ontario TP
- Sucker Creek 23, Ontario R
- Sudbury, Unorganized, North Part, Ontario UNO
- Summer Beaver, Ontario S-E
- Sundridge, Ontario VL

== T ==
- Tarbutt TP
- Tay TP
- Tay Valley TP
- Tecumseh T
- Tehkummah TP
- Temagami T
- Temiskaming Shores C
- Terrace Bay TP
- Thames Centre TP
- Thessalon T
- Thessalon 12 R
- Thornloe VL
- Thorold C
- Thunder Bay C
- Thunder Bay, Unorganized UNO
- Tillsonburg T
- Timiskaming, Unorganized, East Part UNO
- Timiskaming, Unorganized, West Part UNO
- Timmins C
- Tiny TP
- Toronto C
- Trent Hills T
- Trent Lakes TP
- Tudor and Cashel TP
- Tweed TP
- Tyendinaga TP
- Tyendinaga Mohawk Territory R

== U ==
- Uxbridge, Ontario TP

== V ==
- Val Rita-Harty, Ontario TP
- Vaughan, Ontario C

== W ==
- Wabauskang 21, Ontario R
- Wabigoon Lake 27, Ontario R
- Wanapitei 11, Ontario R
- Wahta Mohawk Territory, Ontario R
- Wainfleet, Ontario TP
- Walpole Island 46, Ontario R
- Wapekeka 1, Ontario R
- Wapekeka 2, Ontario R
- Warwick, Ontario TP
- Wasaga Beach, Ontario T
- Waterloo, Ontario C
- Wawa, Ontario TP
- Wawakapewin (Long Dog Lake), Ontario R
- Weagamow Lake 87, Ontario R
- Webequie, Ontario S-E
- Welland, Ontario C
- Wellesley, Ontario TP
- Wellington North, Ontario TP
- West Elgin, Ontario TP
- West Grey, Ontario TP
- West Lincoln, Ontario TP
- West Nipissing, Ontario T
- West Perth, Ontario TP
- Westport, Ontario VL
- Whitby, Ontario T
- Whitchurch–Stouffville, Ontario T
- White River, Ontario TP
- Whitefish Bay 32A, Ontario R
- Whitefish Bay 33A, Ontario R
- Whitefish Bay 34A, Ontario R
- Whitefish Lake 6, Ontario R
- Whitefish River (Part) 4, Ontario R
- Whitesand, Ontario R
- Whitestone, Ontario TP
- Whitewater Region, Ontario TP
- Wikwemikong Unceded 26, Ontario R
- Wilmot, Ontario TP
- Windsor, Ontario C
- Wollaston, Ontario TP
- Woodstock, Ontario C
- Woolwich, Ontario TP
- Wunnumin 1, Ontario R
- Wunnumin 2, Ontario

== Z ==
- Zhiibaahaasing 19 (Cockburn Island 19), Ontario R
- Zhiibaahaasing 19A (Cockburn Island 19A), Ontario R
- Zorra, Ontario TP
