= Lake of the Woods (disambiguation) =

Lake of the Woods a lake occupying parts of the Canadian provinces of Ontario and Manitoba and the U.S. state of Minnesota.

Lake of the Woods may also refer to:

== Lakes ==
In the United States:

- Lake of the Woods (California)
- Lake of the Woods (Indiana)
- Lake of the Woods (New York)
- Lake of the Woods (Oregon)
- Lake of the Woods (Wyoming)

In Canada:

- Lake of the Woods (Manitoulin District), Ontario

== Places ==
In Canada:

- Lake of the Woods, Ontario
- Lake of the Woods 31B, Ontario
- Lake of the Woods 31C, Ontario
- Lake of the Woods 31G, Ontario
- Lake of the Woods 31H, Ontario
- Lake of the Woods 34, Ontario
- Lake of the Woods 35J, Ontario
- Lake of the Woods 37, Ontario
- Lake of the Woods 37B, Ontario

In the United States:

- Lake of the Woods, California
- Lake of the Woods, Illinois, in Champaign County
- Lake of the Woods, Peoria County, Illinois
- Lake of the Woods, Indiana
- Lake of the Woods County, Minnesota
- Lake of the Woods, Oregon
- Lake of the Woods, Virginia

== Other ==
- Lake of the Woods School, Baudette, Minnesota
- The English translation of most of the names of the Concordia Language Villages

== See also ==
- In the Lake of the Woods, a novel by Tim O'Brien
- Lake Woods, Northern Territory, Australia
