= Lake of the Woods, Ontario =

Lake of the Woods
- Township (single-tier)
- Township of Lake of the Woods
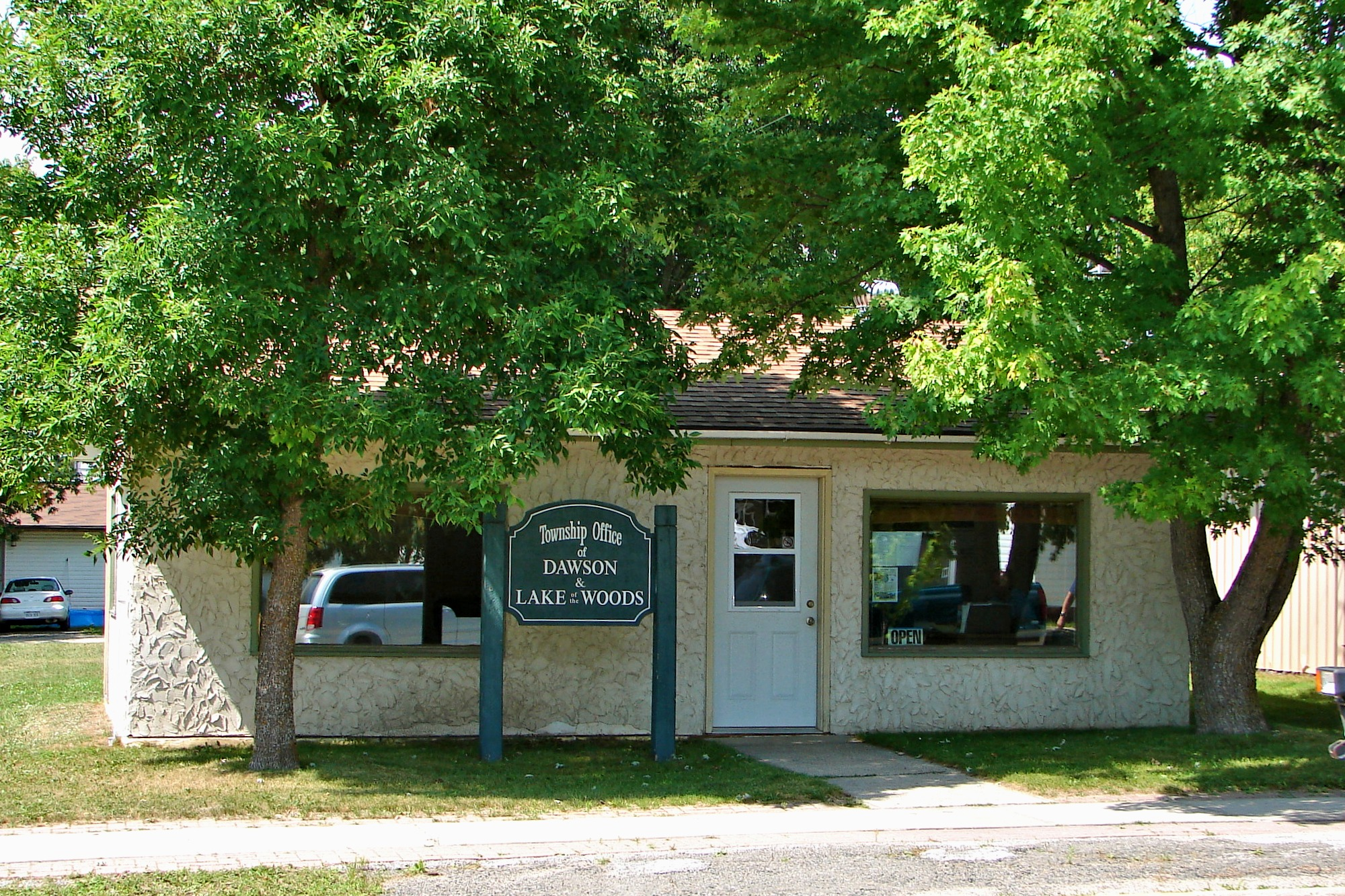
- Township office in Rainy River

- Location within Ontario
- Coordinates: 49°00′N 94°23′W
- Country: Canada
- Province: Ontario
- District: Rainy River
- Formed: January 1, 1998

Government
  - Mayor: Colleen Fadden
  - Fed. riding: Thunder Bay—Rainy River
  - Prov. riding: Kenora—Rainy River

Area
  - Land: 746.24 km^{2} (288.12 sq mi)

Population (2021)
  - Total: 308
  - Density: 0.4/km^{2} (1.0/sq mi)
- Time zone: UTC-6 (CST)
  - Summer (DST): UTC-5 (CDT)
- Postal Code FSA: P0W
- Area code: 807
- Website: lakeofthewoods.ca

Lake of the Woods is a township in the Canadian province of Ontario, located within the Rainy River District.

The township was formed on January 1, 1998, when the former incorporated townships of Morson and McCrosson/Tovell were amalgamated. The following year portions of Unorganized Kenora District were annexed.

== Geography ==
The township is located on the eponymous Lake of the Woods, consisting of mainland in the south-east part of the lake, the southern shores of Aulneau Peninsula, along with several islands in the lake, including Big Island and Bigsby Island. It fully surrounds the Anishnaabeg of Naongashiing, Big Grassy River 35G, Big Island Mainland 93, and Saug-a-Gaw-Sing 1 First Nation reserves.

The primary communities within the township are Bergland, Minahico and Morson.

== Demographics ==
In the 2021 Census of Population conducted by Statistics Canada, Lake of the Woods had a population of 308 living in 140 of its 454 total private dwellings, a change of 33.9% from its 2016 population of 230. With a land area of 746.24 km^{2} (288.12 sq mi), it had a population density of 0.4/km^{2} (1.1/sq mi) in 2021.

Canada census – Lake of the Woods community profile

	2021	2016	2011
Population	308 (+33.9% from 2016)	230 (-22.3% from 2011)	296 (-8.4% from 2006)
Land area	746.24 km^{2} (288.12 sq mi)	751.31 km^{2} (290.08 sq mi)	751.95 km^{2} (290.33 sq mi)
Population density	0.4/km^{2} (1.0/sq mi)	0.3/km^{2} (0.78/sq mi)	0.4/km^{2} (1.0/sq mi)
Median age	59.2 (M: 59.2, F: 58.8)	59.6 (M: 61.1, F: 58.6)
Private dwellings	454 (total) 140 (occupied)	521 (total)	555 (total)
Median household income	$75,000	$55,936

References: 2021 2016 2011

Historical census populations – Lake of the Woods Township
Year	Pop.	±%
1996	432	—
2001	330	−23.6%
2006	323	−2.1%
2011	296	−8.4%
2016	230	−22.3%
2021	308	+33.9%
Source: Statistics Canada

== Notable people ==
- John Elizabeth Stintzi, author

== See also ==
- List of townships in Ontario
