= Sleeman, Ontario =

Sleeman
- Community
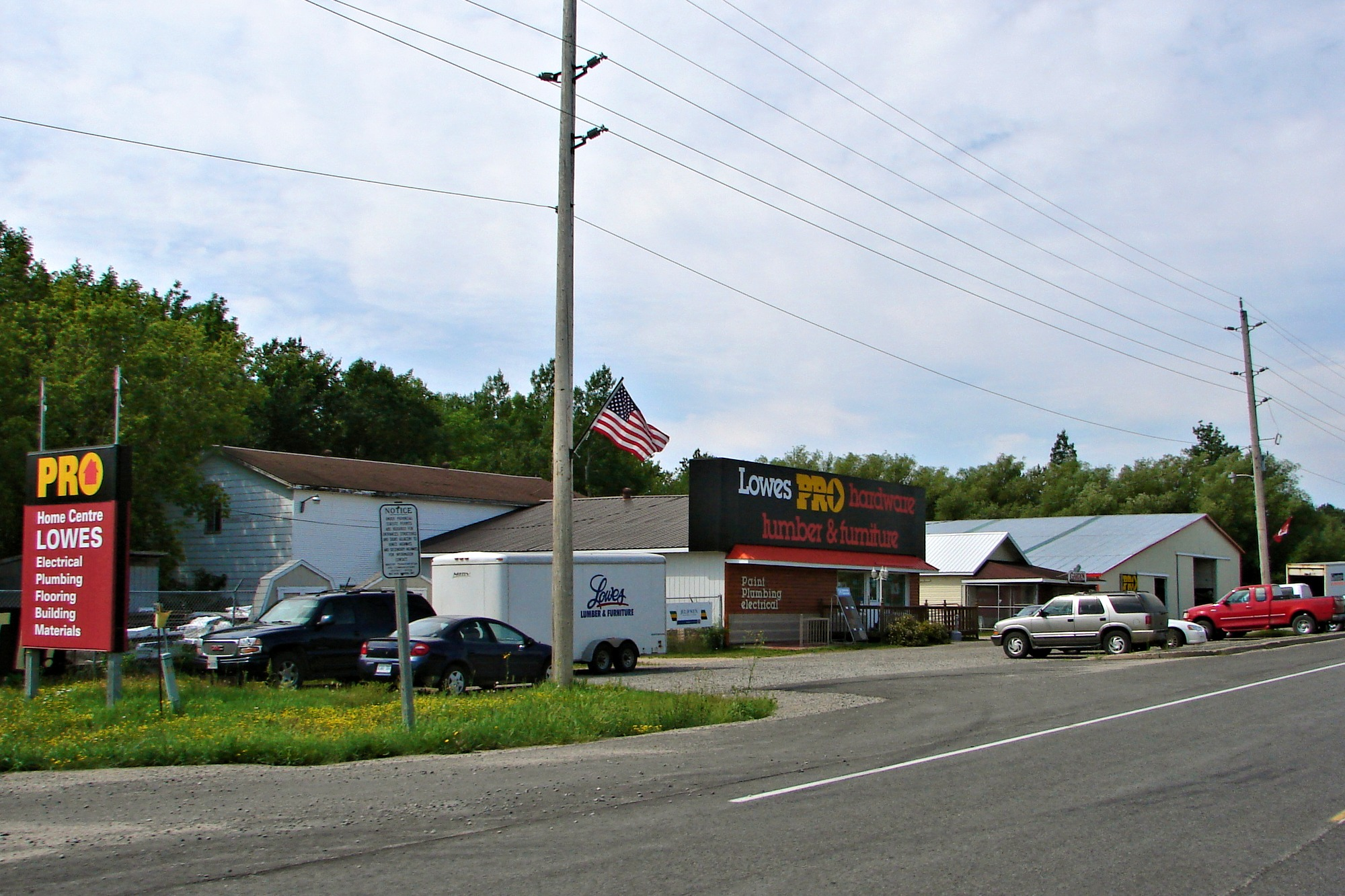

- Location within Ontario
- Coordinates: 48°45′N 94°29′W
- Country: Canada
- Province: Ontario
- District: Rainy River
- Municipality: Dawson
- Settled: late 1700s
- Formed: 1 January 1997

Government
  - Type: Municipality
  - Mayor: Bill Langner
  - Federal riding: Thunder Bay—Rainy River
  - Prov. riding: Kenora—Rainy River
- Elevation: 335 m (1,099 ft)
- Time zone: UTC−6 (CST)
  - Summer (DST): UTC−5 (CDT)
- Postal Code FSA: P0W 1M0
- Area code: 807
- Website: http://dawsontownship.weebly.com/

Sleeman is an unincorporated community located in Rainy River District in Northwestern Ontario, Canada. The town site is located in the center of Dawson. The original town site was along the Rainy River some 3 km south but in the early 1900s when the steam ships that traveled from Fort Frances to Rainy River and then to Rat Portage Via Lake of the Woods carrying Logs, Lumber, mail and other supplies stopped probably because the Canadian Northern Railway had finished its bridge and rail line from Winnipeg to International Falls and the docks of the great lakes located in Fort William and Port Arthur now known as Thunder Bay the town moved from the river to the rail line. The original store, coffee shop, post office building still stands today and has been renovated into a home. The town for many years held many stores, a large hotel, coffee shops, car dealership, school and a busy rail depot that served the Northern communities along Highway 621. A restaurant called The Green Onion was the local favourite. It was open 7 days a week and held indoor livery stables below for the travels from Morson who came to town to meet the trains, liquor was served here as well. Today there is only one business left, the Canada Postal outlet. Lowes Lumber, a local business for over 80 years went into bankruptcy and closed its doors in 2014. Only about 20 homes remain, even though an official town plan was made to accommodate many more. The rail siding was removed in 1993, the last of the CN hotel burned away in the late 1980s and the grocery store was demolished when the natural gas line was installed to serve the larger communities along Highway 11.

The township of Dawson was formed on 1 January 1997, when the former incorporated townships of Atwood, Blue, Dilke, and Worthington were amalgamated.

== Climate ==
As recorded by John Trenchard (late) weather observer for Environment Canada from 1964 to 1991.

Climate data for Sleeman
| Month | Jan | Feb | Mar | Apr | May | Jun | Jul | Aug | Sep | Oct | Nov | Dec | Year |
|---|---|---|---|---|---|---|---|---|---|---|---|---|---|
| Record high °C (°F) | 7 (45) | 11 (52) | 16.5 (61.7) | 31.5 (88.7) | 32.5 (90.5) | 33.5 (92.3) | 35 (95) | 34.5 (94.1) | 34.4 (93.9) | 26.7 (80.1) | 22.2 (72.0) | 9 (48) | 35 (95) |
| Mean daily maximum °C (°F) | −11.4 (11.5) | −7 (19) | 0.3 (32.5) | 10.5 (50.9) | 18.8 (65.8) | 22.3 (72.1) | 25 (77) | 23.4 (74.1) | 17.3 (63.1) | 10.5 (50.9) | −0.2 (31.6) | −8.9 (16.0) | 8.4 (47.1) |
| Daily mean °C (°F) | −17.2 (1.0) | −13.2 (8.2) | −5.6 (21.9) | 4.1 (39.4) | 11.8 (53.2) | 16.2 (61.2) | 19 (66) | 17.4 (63.3) | 11.8 (53.2) | 5.7 (42.3) | −4.1 (24.6) | −14 (7) | 2.7 (36.9) |
| Mean daily minimum °C (°F) | −22.9 (−9.2) | −19.3 (−2.7) | −11.4 (11.5) | −2.2 (28.0) | 4.8 (40.6) | 9.9 (49.8) | 12.9 (55.2) | 11.4 (52.5) | 6.3 (43.3) | 0.8 (33.4) | −8 (18) | −19.1 (−2.4) | −3.1 (26.4) |
| Record low °C (°F) | −44 (−47) | −41 (−42) | −37.5 (−35.5) | −27.8 (−18.0) | −8 (18) | −2 (28) | 1.1 (34.0) | −1.7 (28.9) | −6 (21) | −17 (1) | −39 (−38) | −43 (−45) | −44 (−47) |
| Average precipitation mm (inches) | 27.9 (1.10) | 21.6 (0.85) | 30.1 (1.19) | 37.9 (1.49) | 60.4 (2.38) | 107.5 (4.23) | 86.4 (3.40) | 90.5 (3.56) | 69.3 (2.73) | 57.7 (2.27) | 37.2 (1.46) | 23.5 (0.93) | 650 (25.6) |
Source: Environment Canada
