= Dawson Township, Ontario =

There are a number of townships named Dawson in Ontario:

- Dawson Township, Manitoulin District, Ontario
- Dawson, Ontario (incorporated)
