= Unorganized Rainy River District =

- Unorganized area
- Rainy River, Unorganized
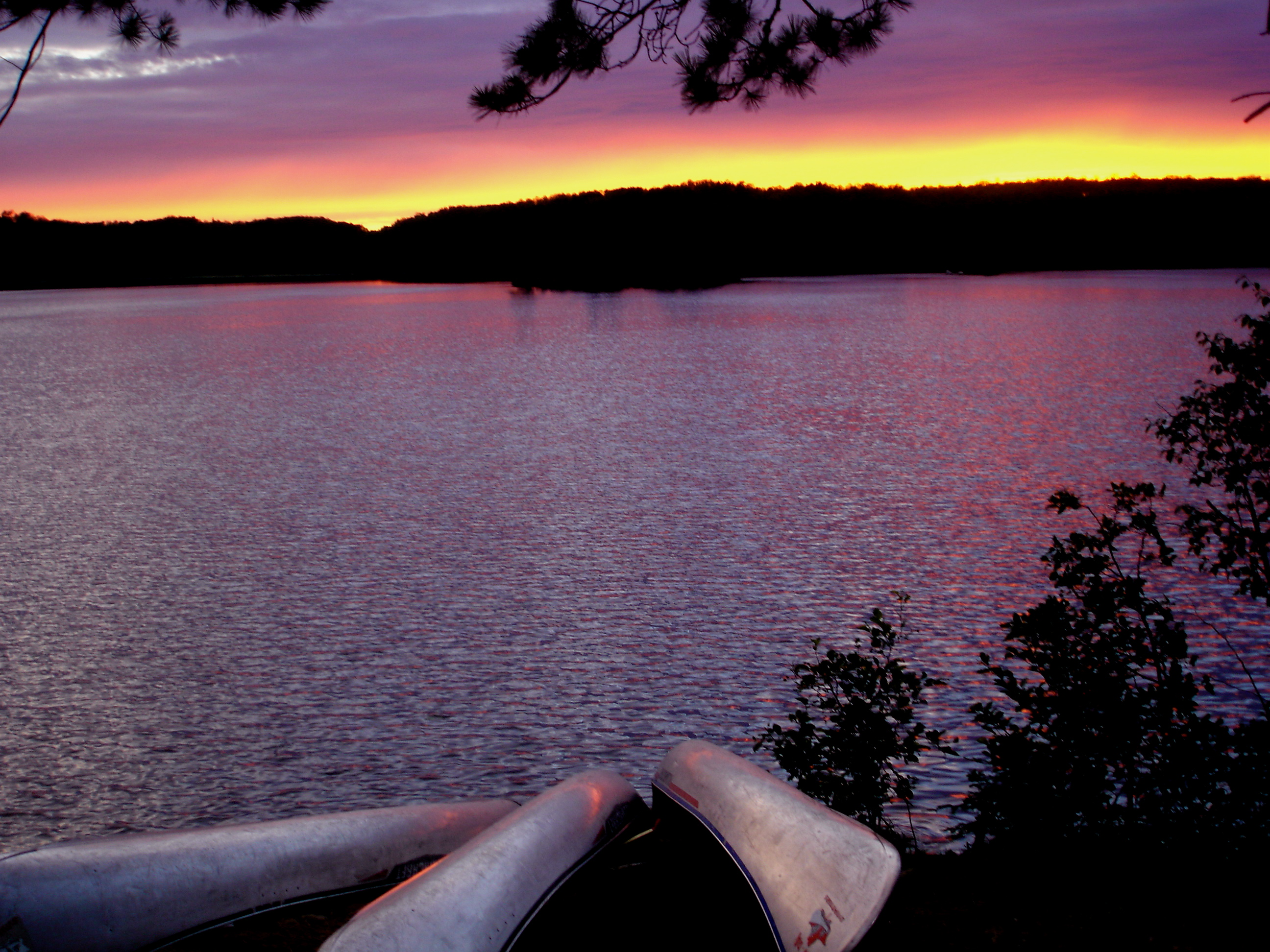
- Quetico sunset

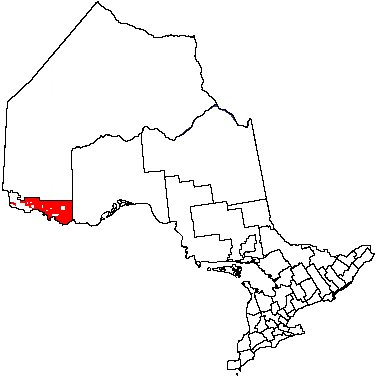
- Coordinates: 48°45′N 92°30′W
- Country: Canada
- Province: Ontario
- District: Rainy River

Government
  - Fed. riding: Thunder Bay—Rainy River
  - Prov. riding: Kenora—Rainy River; Thunder Bay—Atikokan

Area
  - Land: 12,163.33 km^{2} (4,696.29 sq mi)

Population (2021)
  - Total: 1,423
  - Density: 0.1/km^{2} (0.26/sq mi)
- Time zone: UTC-6 (CST)
  - Summer (DST): UTC-5 (CDT)
- Area code: 807

Unorganized Rainy River District is an unorganized area in the Rainy River District of Ontario, Canada, comprising all communities in the district which are not part of incorporated municipalities. Quetico Provincial Park is located entirely within this area.

The area has gradually been reduced in size as portions of it were annexed by surrounding incorporated townships. For example, its area was 14,272.09 square kilometres (5,510.48 sq mi) in the 1981 census, but reduced to 12,163.33 square kilometres (4,696.29 sq mi) in the 2021 census. In 2004, the Township of Morley annexed the geographic townships of Sifton and Dewart, thereby splitting Unorganized Rainy River into two non-contiguous areas.

The Township of Atikokan, as well as the Indian reserves of Rainy Lake 17A, 17B, 26A, Seine River 23A, and 23B, are enclaves within the unorganized area.

Communities include:

- Arbor Vitae
- Burditt Lake
- Calm Lake
- Flanders
- Crilly
- Gameland
- Glenorchy
- Government Landing
- Kawene
- Mine Centre
- Off Lake Corner
- Rocky Inlet
- Sapawe

== Demographics ==
Canada census – Rainy River, Unorganized community profile

	2021	2016	2011
Population	1,423 (+3.1% from 2016)	1,385 (+19.5% from 2011)	1159 (-19.0% from 2006)
Land area	12,163.33 km^{2} (4,696.29 sq mi)	12,257.85 km^{2} (4,732.78 sq mi)	12,256.16 km^{2} (4,732.13 sq mi)
Population density	0.1/km^{2} (0.26/sq mi)	0.1/km^{2} (0.26/sq mi)	0.1/km^{2} (0.26/sq mi)
Median age	54.4 (M: 55.2, F: 53.6)	55.5 (M: 56.2, F: 54.8)
Private dwellings	1,662 (total) 572 (occupied)	2,048 (total) 593 (occupied)	1523 (total)
Median household income	$99,000	$81,664

References: 2021 2016 2011

Historical census populations – Rainy River, Unorganized

Year	Pop.	±%
1976	1,530	—
1981	1,379	−9.9%
1986	1,561	+13.2%
1991	1,495	−4.2%
1996	1,580	+5.7%

Year	Pop.	±%
2001	1,605	+1.6%
2006	1,431	−10.8%
2011	1,159	−19.0%
2016	1,385	+19.5%
2021	1,423	+2.7%

Population counts are not adjusted for boundary changes.
Source: Statistics Canada

== See also ==
- List of townships in Ontario
