= La Cloche Provincial Park =

Provincial park in Ontario, Canada

- IUCN category II (national park)
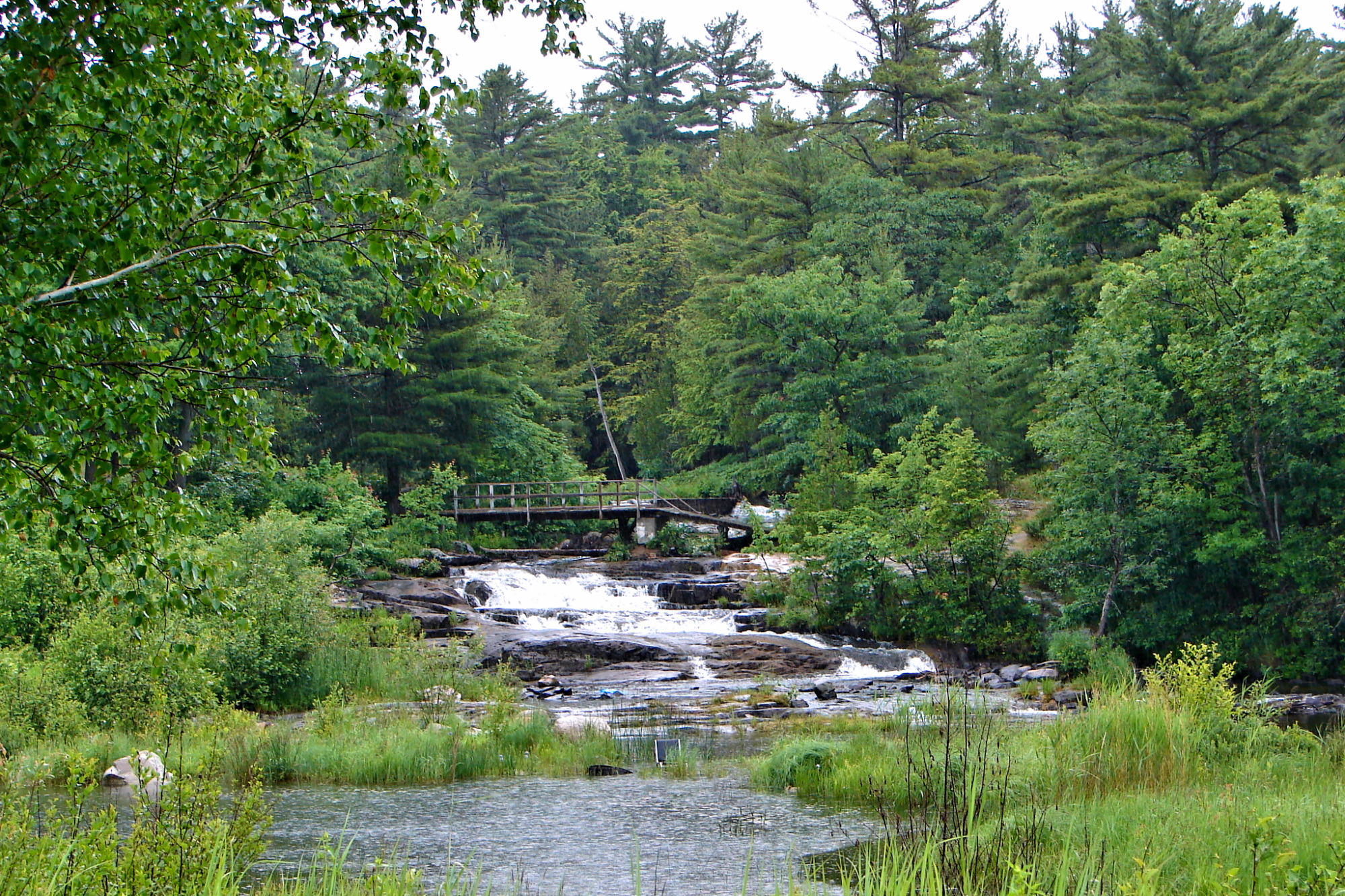
- Riviere La Cloche

- Location within Ontario
- Location: Unorganized SE Algoma, Sables-Spanish Rivers
- Nearest town: Massey, Ontario
- Coordinates: 46°06′18″N 82°01′30″W
- Area: 7,448 ha (28.76 sq mi)
- Established: 1985
- Governing body: Ontario Parks
- Website: www.ontarioparks.com/park/lacloche

La Cloche Provincial Park is a provincial park at the boundary of Algoma and Sudbury Districts in Ontario, Canada. The park consists of an unspoiled section of the La Cloche Mountains that stretch along the North Channel of Georgian Bay, as well as several islands in the channel (which are mostly part of Manitoulin District).

Notable features of the park include the site of the former Fort La Cloche trading post and diabase dykes cutting through older Lorrain, Gowganda, and Bruce formations, as well as ridge and terrace forests, and various wetlands and shoreline vegetation. The park surrounds most of La Cloche Lake, which drains into the North Channel via the Riviere La Cloche (La Cloche River).

The park borders the La Cloche Ridge Conservation Reserve to the east, which also protects a rugged portion of the La Cloche Mountains and forms a natural corridor to Killarney Provincial Park further east. The approximately 40-kilometre (25 mi) long Heaven's Gate Trail stretches from Fort La Cloche in the park through the conservation reserve to Highway 6 at Willisville.

It is a non-operating park, meaning there are no facilities or services.

== History ==
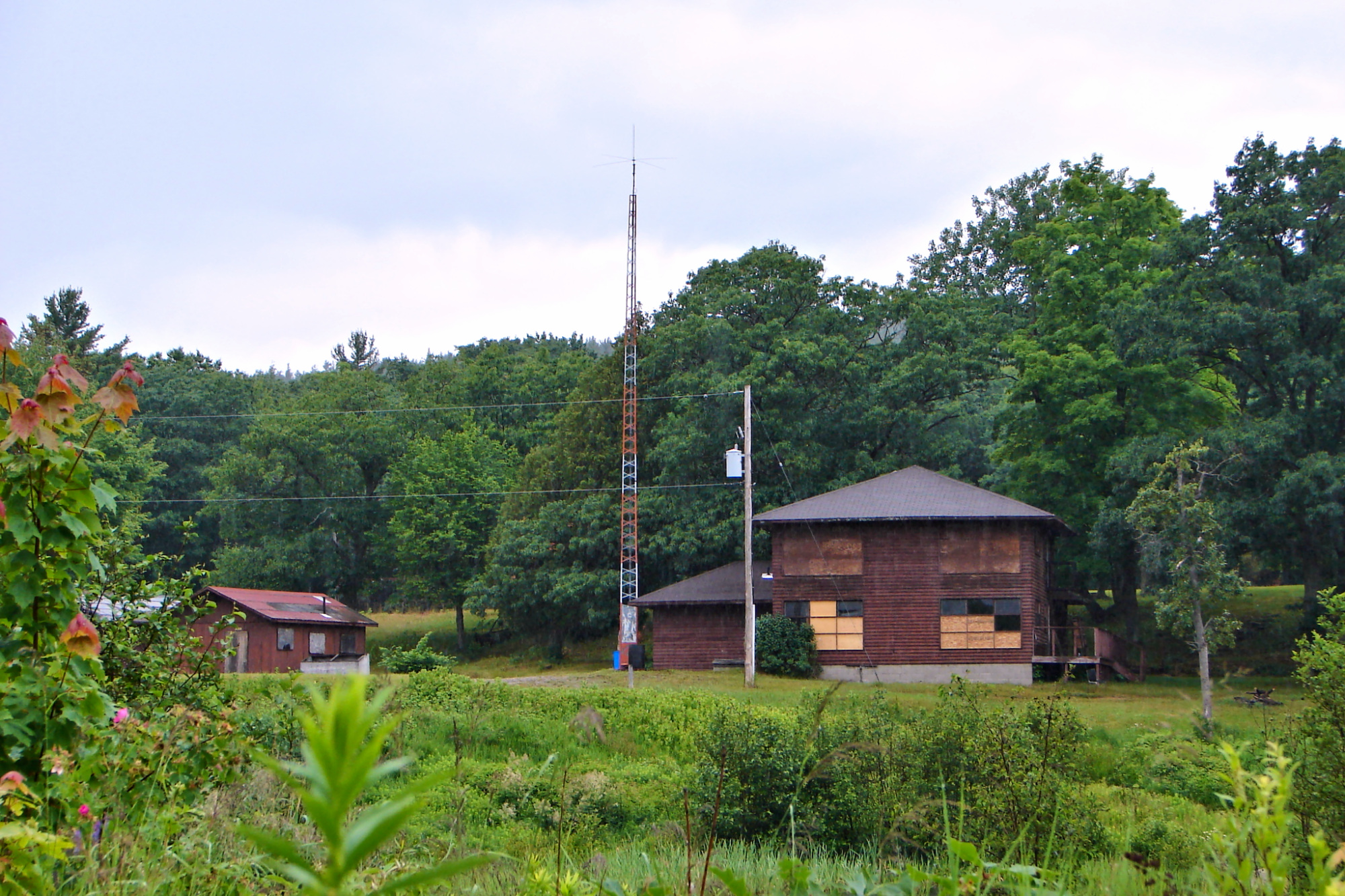
Former lodge at Fort La Cloche

Fort La Cloche (46°6′48″N 82°4′36″W) was established probably around 1790 by the North West Company along the fur trade route, about 10 miles (16 km) east of the mouth of the Spanish River. The post was named after a rock, which rung like a bell (French: la cloche) when struck.

When the North West Company merged with the Hudson's Bay Company in 1821, the post continued to operate as a HBC post. It was the district's headquarters and at that time the principal and only permanent post in the Lake Huron District. By the end of the 1820s, it consisted of the Chief Factor, one clerk, and four labourers. It faced competition from two "free traders" nearby, who abandoned their trading posts by 1832. In September of the following year until June 1834, a measles epidemic broke out in the district, claiming the lives of one man, seven women and eight children at La Cloche.

By winter 1834-35 the trading post staff had grown to one Chief Factor, one boat builder, one blacksmith, four men, and one apprentice boy. In 1836, the post was described as "the first and only signs of civilized society ... The factory consists of a large log-house and extensive store to contain the goods bartered with the Indians, and huts inhabited by work peoples, hunters, voyageurs and others; a small village in short." It was the main commercial centre in the district, and a seasonal settlement and economic hub for the local First Nations.

The English military officer and scientist John Henry Lefroy visited Fort La Cloche in May 1843 as part of his journey northwest from Toronto to attempt to locate the north magnetic pole. He described it as a large settlement of "Chippeways" (Ojibwe) and remarked on the solitude of the lake aside from a few canoes. In 1844, the district's headquarters were relocated to Sault Ste. Marie, but 4 years later, the La Cloche post regained this function.

When the Canadian Pacific Railway reached Sudbury in the 1880s, the post lost its importance and closed in 1886. Afterwards, the buildings were used as residence/office by the J&T Conlon lumber company, and then as roadhouse for mail teams on the winter mail route between Little Current and Massey. Soon after the railroad to Little Current was completed in 1913, the winter mail route through La Cloche was discontinued, and the buildings of the post were torn down and burned. Nothing of the original post remained.

In 1968, the Department of Lands and Forests acquired the land for $150,000. Excavations were conducted in the same year by the Royal Ontario Museum, producing finds which included a clay marble, which was commonly produced in the late 19th and early 20th centuries.

Subsequently, a Junior Rangers camp was constructed at the location of Fort La Cloche. Along with a tourist lodge, this operated there for a number of years and closed before the area became a provincial park.

== See also ==
- Henry John Moberly - fur trader at Fort La Cloche
- Sagamok Anishnawbek First Nation - directly west of La Cloche Provincial Park
