= Animakee Wa Zhing 37 First Nation =

First Nation in Ontario, Canada

Animakee Wa Zhing 37 First Nation (formerly Northwest Angle 37 First Nation, Ojibwe language: Animikii-wajiing, meaning Sacred place of the Thunderbirds) is an Anishinaabe First Nation in northwestern Ontario. It is a part of the Anishinabeg of Kabapikotawangag Resource Council, which is in turn part of the Grand Council of Treaty 3.

As of 2015, the First Nation had a registered membership of 405 people, 179 of whom were living on Animakee Wa Zhing 37 reserve lands.

== Reserve lands ==
Name	Size
Agency 30 (shared with other First Nations)	379 hectares (940 acres)
Big Island 37	787.50 hectares (1,946.0 acres)
Lake of the Woods 34	259.40 hectares (641.0 acres)
Lake of the Woods 37	1,137 hectares (2,810 acres)
Lake of the Woods 37B	106 hectares (260 acres)
Northwest Angle 34C	303.50 hectares (750.0 acres)
Northwest Angle 34C & 37B	792.80 hectares (1,959.1 acres)
Northwest Angle 37C	279.20 hectares (689.9 acres)
Shoal Lake 34B1	259 hectares (640 acres)
Shoal Lake 37A	777 hectares (1,920 acres)
Whitefish Bay 34A (the most populated site)	609 hectares (1,500 acres)

== Leadership ==
In the December 2021 election, Linda McVicar was elected chief, with Don Kavanaugh, Angel Andrushuk, Lorraine Major and Theresa Noonan as councillors.
