= Big Island 31D =

- Indian reserve
- Big Island Indian Reserve No. 31D
- Location within Ontario
- Coordinates: 49°07′N 94°38′W
- Country: Canada
- Province: Ontario
- District: Rainy River
- First Nation: Naongashiing

Area
  - Land: 3.70 km^{2} (1.43 sq mi)

Big Island 31D is a First Nations reserve on Big Island in Lake of the Woods, northwestern Ontario, Canada. It is one of the reserves of the Anishnaabeg of Naongashiing.
