= John Elizabeth Stintzi =

Canadian writer

John Elizabeth Stintzi (also known as JES) is a Canadian-born writer, most noted for winning the RBC Bronwen Wallace Award for Emerging Writers in 2019. They are a dual citizen of both the United States and Canada.

Stintzi, who is non-binary and uses they/them and she/her pronouns, was raised in Bergland, Ontario, and educated at the University of Manitoba and Stony Brook University. While at Stony Brook, she wrote the novel Vanishing Monuments as her MFA thesis; after graduating, they moved to Jersey City, New Jersey, where they began writing the poetry collection Junebat.

Following her Bronwen Wallace award win, Stintzi secured publishers for both Junebat and Vanishing Monuments, which were both published in early 2020. Vanishing Monuments was shortlisted for the 2021 Amazon.ca First Novel Award.

Their second novel, My Volcano, was awarded the inaugural Sator New Works Award from Two Dollar Radio and was published in March 2022 by the press in the United States and Arsenal Pulp Press in Canada. My Volcano was named a Best Fiction Book of 2022 by the New York Public Library and by Kirkus Reviews, which called the novel a "vibrant ecosystem of a novel that deals honestly with the beauty and horror of human and ecological connectedness." Stintzi published a collection of short stories, Bad Houses, in 2024.

Stintzi currently lives and works in Kansas City, Missouri.

== Works ==
=== Fiction ===
- Vanishing Monuments. Arsenal Pulp Press, 2020. ISBN 9781551528014
- My Volcano. Arsenal Pulp Press, 2022. ISBN 9781551528731
- Bad Houses. Arsenal Pulp Press, 2024. ISBN 9781551529615

=== Poetry ===
- Junebat. House of Anansi Press, 2020. ISBN 9781487007843
