= Big Island 31E =

- Indian reserve
- Big Island Indian Reserve No. 31E
- Location within Ontario
- Coordinates: 49°08′N 94°36.5′W
- Country: Canada
- Province: Ontario
- District: Rainy River
- First Nation: Naongashiing

Area
  - Land: 7.77 km^{2} (3.00 sq mi)

Big Island 31E is a First Nations reserve on Big Island in Lake of the Woods, northwestern Ontario, Canada. It is one of the reserves of the Anishnaabeg of Naongashiing.
