= Unorganized South East Algoma District =

- Unorganized area
- Algoma, Unorganized, South East Part
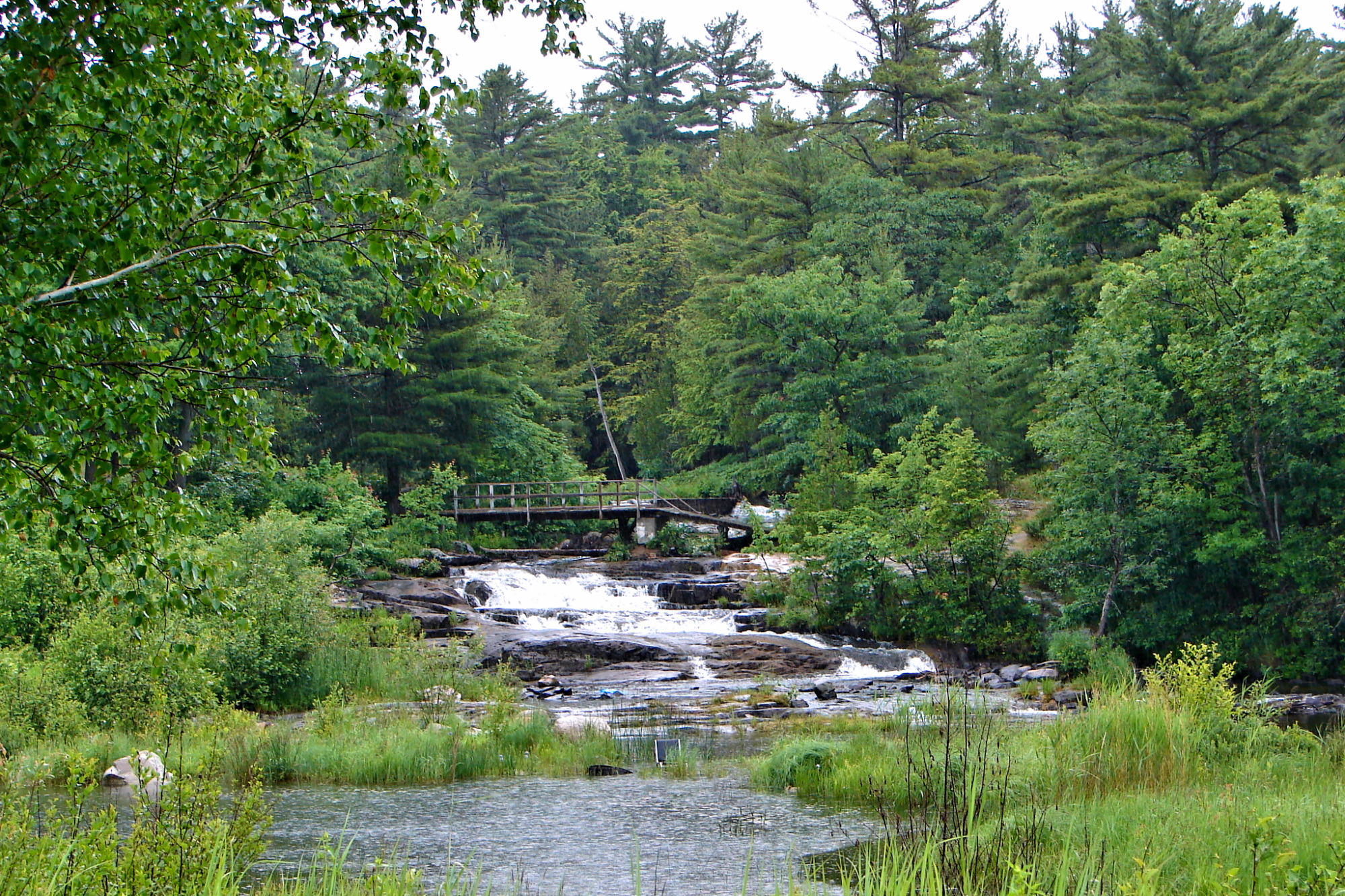
- Riviere La Cloche

- Location within Ontario
- Coordinates: 46°07′00″N 82°04′30″W
- Country: Canada
- Province: Ontario
- District: Algoma

Government
  - Federal riding: Sault Ste. Marie—Algoma
  - Prov. riding: Algoma—Manitoulin

Area
  - Land: 43.17 km^{2} (16.67 sq mi)

Population (2021)
  - Total: 5
  - Density: 0.1/km^{2} (0.26/sq mi)
- Time zone: UTC-5 (EST)
  - Summer (DST): UTC-4 (EDT)

Unorganized South East Algoma District is an unorganized area in the Canadian province of Ontario, comprising a small unincorporated portion in the southeasternmost corner of the Algoma District. It comprises a small strip of land which lies between the territory of the Sagamok First Nation and the Algoma District's boundary with the Sudbury District, as well as several small islands within the North Channel of Lake Huron, such as Eagle, Fréchette, Fox, Hotham, Middleton, North and South Benjamin Islands.

The division comprises 43.17 square kilometres (16.67 sq mi) (increased from 41.71 km^{2} in the 2001 census), and had a reported population of 5 in the 2021 Canadian census.

The division includes the historic Fort La Cloche trading post and a small portion of La Cloche Provincial Park.

== Demographics ==
Historical census populations – Algoma, Unorganized, South East Part

Year	Pop.	±%
1991	0	—
1996	0	0.00%
2001	0	0.00%
2006	0	0.00%

Year	Pop.	±%
2011	0	0.00%
2016	0	0.00%
2021	5	—

Population counts are not adjusted for boundary changes.
Source: Statistics Canada

== See also ==
- List of townships in Ontario
