= Big Island 37 =

- Indian reserve
- Big Island Indian Reserve No. 37
- Location within Ontario
- Coordinates: 49°10′N 94°46′W
- Country: Canada
- Province: Ontario
- District: Rainy River
- First Nation: Animakee Wa Zhing 37

Area
  - Land: 7.9 km^{2} (3.1 sq mi)

Big Island 37 is a First Nations reserve on Big Island in Lake of the Woods, in Ontario, Canada. It is one of the reserves of the Animakee Wa Zhing 37 First Nation.
