= Mamaweswen, The North Shore Tribal Council =

Mamaweswen
- Formation: 1984
- Headquarters: 473 Highway 17 W
- Location: Cutler, Ontario
- Members: 7 First Nations
- Chief Executive Officer: Allan Moffatt
- Website: mamaweswen.com

Mamaweswen, The North Shore Tribal Council is a First Nations tribal council representing seven First Nations along the north shore of Lake Huron, in Robinson Huron Treaty territory. It facilitates services to the First Nation communities, including health care, education, economic development, employment and training.

The seven First Nations include:

- Atikameksheng Anishnawbek First Nation
- Batchewana First Nation
- Garden River First Nation
- Mississauga First Nation
- Sagamok Anishnawbek First Nation
- Serpent River First Nation
- Thessalon First Nation

They run a number of programs, including Koognaasewin - Child Well-being Law and Niigaaniin Social Services. They are affiliated with Robinson Huron Waawiindamaagewin, Benbowopka Treatment Centre, Maamwesying North Shore Community Health Services and Nogdawindamin Family and Community Services.
