= Shoal Lake 31J =

- Indian reserve
- Shoal Lake Indian Reserve No. 31J
- Location within Ontario
- Coordinates: 49°26′N 95°07′W
- Country: Canada
- Province: Ontario
- District: Kenora
- First Nation: Naongashiing

Area
  - Land: 5.18 km^{2} (2.00 sq mi)

Shoal Lake 31J is a First Nations reserve on Shoal Lake, northwestern Ontario. It is one of the reserves of the Anishnaabeg of Naongashiing.
