= Shoal Lake 34B1 =

- Indian reserve
- Shoal Lake Indian Reserve No. 34B1
- Location within Ontario
- Coordinates: 49°26′N 95°06′W
- Country: Canada
- Province: Ontario
- District: Kenora
- First Nation: Animakee Wa Zhing 37

Area
  - Land: 2.59 km^{2} (1.00 sq mi)

Shoal Lake 34B1 is a First Nations reserve at the southwestern end of Shoal Lake in Kenora District, Ontario. It is one of the reserves of the Animakee Wa Zhing 37 First Nation.
