= Northwest Angle 34C & 37B =

- Indian reserve
- Northwest Angle Indian Reserve Nos. 34C & 37B
- Location within Ontario
- Coordinates: 49°23′N 95°08′W
- Country: Canada
- Province: Ontario
- District: Kenora
- First Nation: Animakee Wa Zhing 37

Area
  - Land: 7.93 km^{2} (3.06 sq mi)

Northwest Angle 34C & 37B is a First Nations reserve in Kenora District, Ontario. It borders Manitoba, and is adjacent to the Northwest Angle in Minnesota. It is one of the reserves of the Animakee Wa Zhing 37 First Nation.
