= Morley, Ontario =

Morley
- Township (single-tier)
- Township of Morley
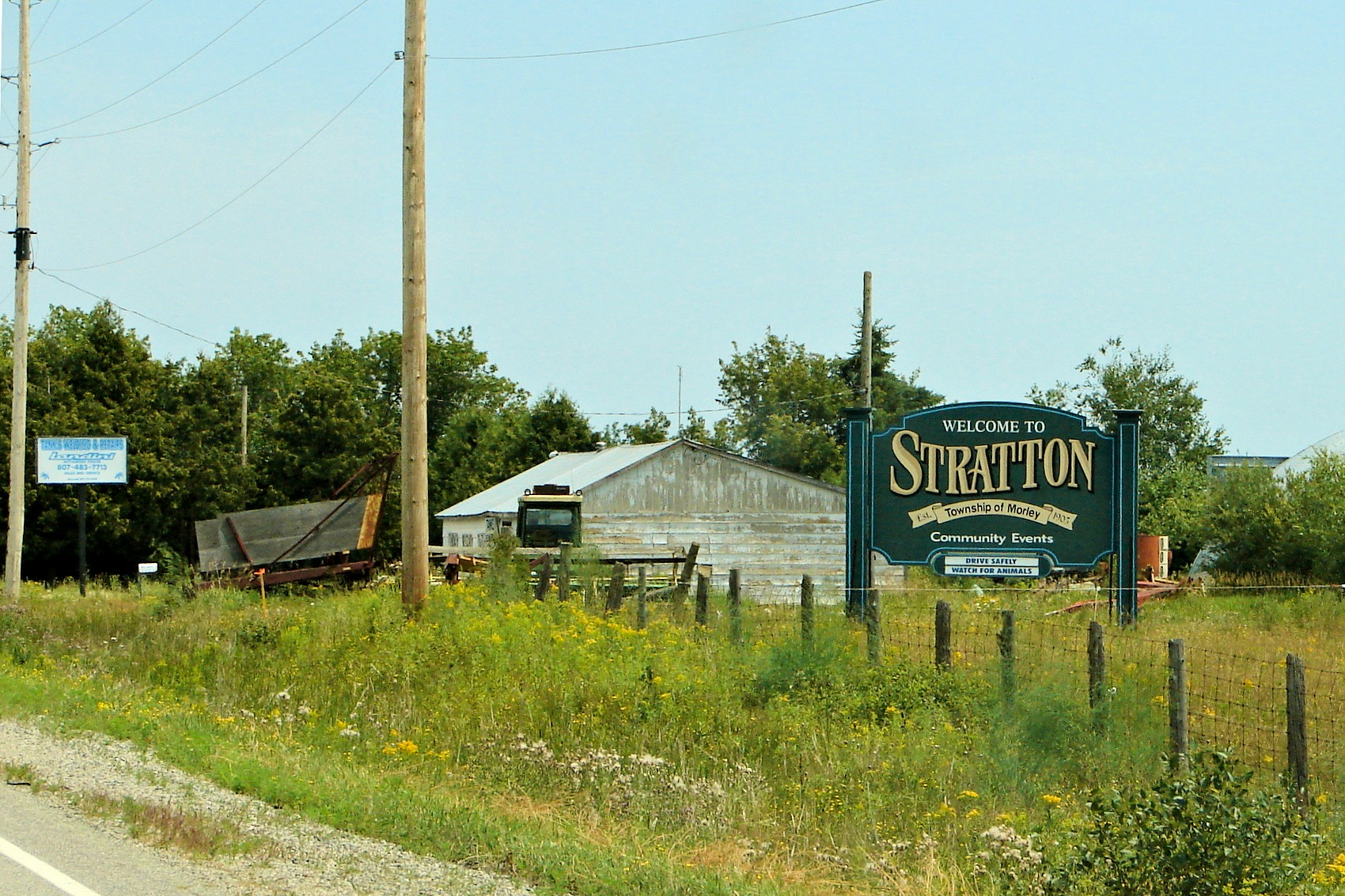
- Stratton

- Location within Ontario
- Coordinates: 48°50′N 94°10′W
- Country: Canada
- Province: Ontario
- District: Rainy River
- Settled: 1880s
- Incorporated: 1903

Government
  - Reeve: Telford Advent
  - Fed. riding: Thunder Bay—Rainy River
  - Prov. riding: Kenora—Rainy River

Area
  - Land: 388.38 km^{2} (149.95 sq mi)

Population (2021)
  - Total: 493
  - Density: 1.3/km^{2} (3.4/sq mi)
- Time zone: UTC-6 (CST)
  - Summer (DST): UTC-5 (CDT)
- Postal Code FSA: P0W 1N0
- Area code: 807
- Website: www.townshipofmorley.ca

Morley is a township in the Canadian province of Ontario, located within the Rainy River District. Named after John Morley, it was formed in 1903 when the townships of Morley and Pattullo, as well as the village of Stratton, were amalgamated.

In 2004, the Township of Morley was greatly expanded through the addition of the geographic townships of Sifton and Dewart, that were previously part of Unorganized Rainy River District.

== Demographics ==
In the 2021 Census of Population conducted by Statistics Canada, Morley had a population of 493 living in 186 of its 235 total private dwellings, a change of 2.5% from its 2016 population of 481. With a land area of 388.38 km^{2} (149.95 sq mi), it had a population density of 1.3/km^{2} (3.3/sq mi) in 2021.

Canada census – Morley community profile

	2021	2016	2011
Population	493 (+2.5% from 2016)	481 (-4.0% from 2011)	501 (+1.8% from 2006)
Land area	388.38 km^{2} (149.95 sq mi)	390.61 km^{2} (150.82 sq mi)	375.61 km^{2} (145.02 sq mi)
Population density	1.3/km^{2} (3.4/sq mi)	1.2/km^{2} (3.1/sq mi)	1.3/km^{2} (3.4/sq mi)
Median age	40.0 (M: 40.0, F: 40.0)	40.6 (M: 41.1, F: 40.3)	45.5 (M: 45.9, F: 44.2)
Private dwellings	235 (total) 186 (occupied)	232 (total)	227 (total)
Median household income	$90,000	$71,680

Notes: 2011 population was revised from 474 to 501 after initial publication.
References: 2021 2016 2011

Historical census populations – Morley, Ontario

Year	Pop.	±%
1901	338	—
1911	517	+53.0%
1921	649	+25.5%
1931	717	+10.5%
1941	773	+7.8%
1951	644	−16.7%
1956	609	−5.4%

Year	Pop.	±%
1961	633	+3.9%
1966	596	−5.8%
1971	605	+1.5%
1976	585	−3.3%
1981	515	−12.0%
1986	530	+2.9%
1991	495	−6.6%

Year	Pop.	±%
1996	478	−3.4%
2001	447	−6.5%
2006	492	+10.1%
2011	501	+1.8%
2016	481	−4.0%
2021	493	+2.5%

2011 Population figures based on revised count. Population counts are not adjusted for boundary changes.
Source: Statistics Canada

== See also ==
- List of townships in Ontario
