= Naongashing 31A =

- Indian reserve
- Naongashing Indian Reserve No. 31A
- Location within Ontario
- Coordinates: 49°15′N 94°30′W
- Country: Canada
- Province: Ontario
- District: Rainy River
- First Nation: Naongashiing

Area
  - Land: 5.18 km^{2} (2.00 sq mi)

Naongashing 31A is a First Nations reserve on Lake of the Woods, northwestern Ontario. It is one of the reserves of the Anishnaabeg of Naongashiing.
