= Alberton, Ontario =

Township in Ontario, Canada

Alberton
- Township (single-tier)
- Township of Alberton
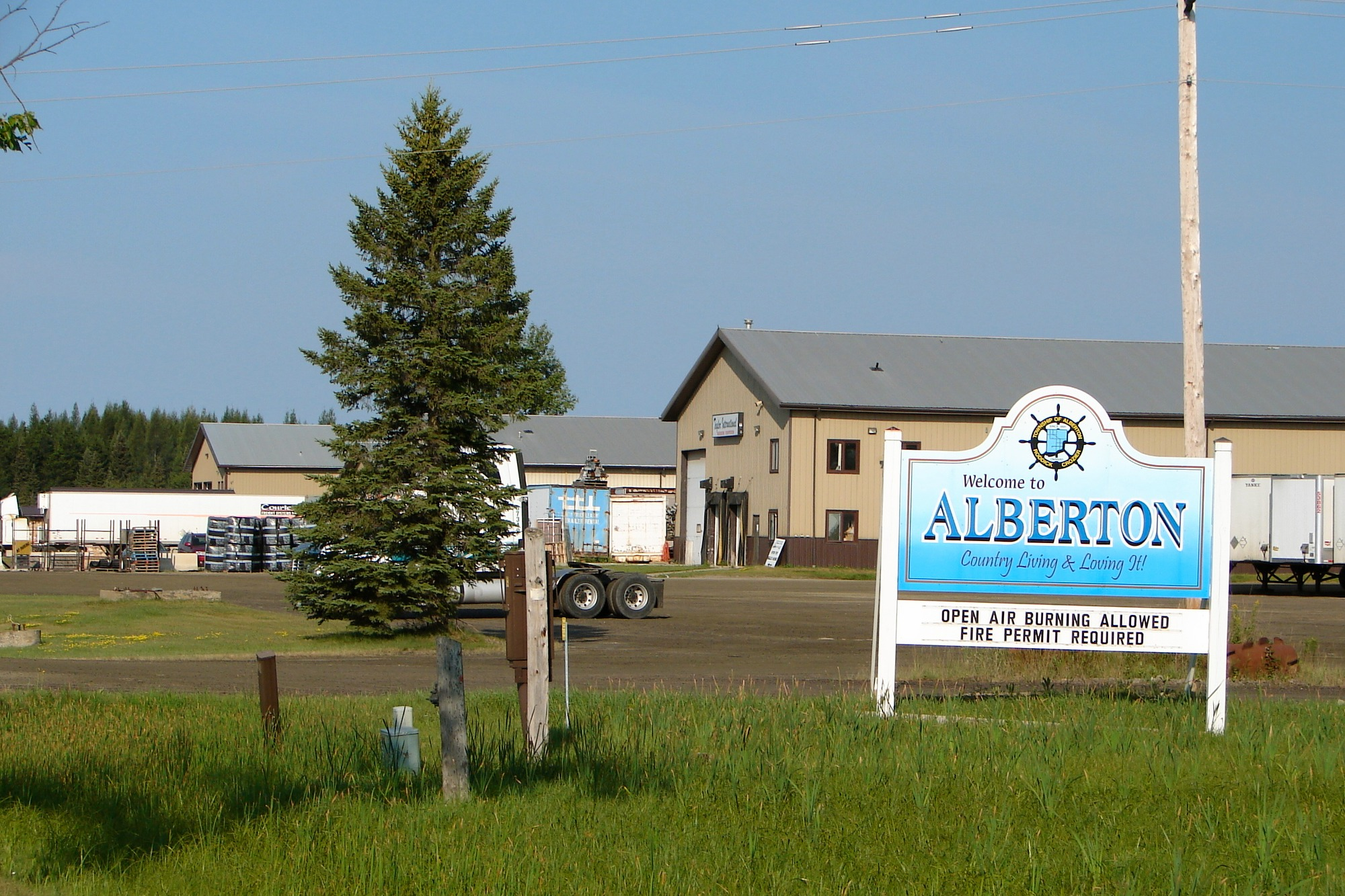
- Motto: Onward
- Location within Ontario
- Coordinates: 48°36′N 93°32′W
- Country: Canada
- Province: Ontario
- District: Rainy River
- Established: 1891

Government
  - Type: Town council
  - Reeve: Michael Ford
  - Fed. riding: Thunder Bay—Rainy River
  - Prov. riding: Kenora—Rainy River

Area
  - Land: 116.60 km^{2} (45.02 sq mi)

Population (2021)
  - Total: 954
  - Density: 8.2/km^{2} (21/sq mi)
- Time zone: UTC-6 (CST)
  - Summer (DST): UTC-5 (CDT)
- Postal code span: P9A
- Area code: 807
- Website: www.alberton.ca

Alberton is a township in the Rainy River District of Northwestern Ontario, Canada. It is made up of the two geographic townships Crozier and Roddick.

== Geography ==
The township borders Fort Frances to the east, La Vallee to the west, the unincorporated geographical township of Miscampbell to the north, and the city of International Falls (Minnesota, United States) to the south.

== Demographics ==
In the 2021 Census of Population conducted by Statistics Canada, Alberton had a population of 954 living in 340 of its 355 total private dwellings, a change of −1.5% from its 2016 population of 969. With a land area of 116.6 km^{2} (45.0 sq mi), it had a population density of 8.2/km^{2} (21.2/sq mi) in 2021.

In 2016, 52% of the community was male, and 48% is female. The median age is 40.8.

Historical census populations – Alberton, Ontario

Year	Pop.	±%
1901	177	—
1911	235	+32.8%
1921	278	+18.3%
1931	360	+29.5%
1941	501	+39.2%
1951	385	−23.2%
1956	498	+29.4%

Year	Pop.	±%
1961	491	−1.4%
1966	642	+30.8%
1971	646	+0.6%
1976	681	+5.4%
1981	803	+17.9%
1986	874	+8.8%
1991	919	+5.1%

Year	Pop.	±%
1996	1,027	+11.8%
2001	956	−6.9%
2006	958	+0.2%
2011	864	−9.8%
2016	969	+12.2%
2021	954	−1.5%

Source: Statistics Canada

== Government ==
Alberton is governed by a town council consisting of a reeve, Michael Ford, and four councillors, Peter Spuzak, Jennifer Johnson, Dianne Glowasky and Dan DeGagne. The council meets on the second Wednesday of each month.

Alberton is located in the federal electoral district of Thunder Bay—Rainy River and in the provincial electoral district of Kenora—Rainy River.

Alberton has a twenty-member volunteer fire department, and is protected by the Ontario Provincial Police.

== Parks and recreation ==
Millennium Skating Rink and Park was built in 2001 with funding from the township and the Northern Ontario Heritage Fund. The facility is maintained by volunteers of the Alberton Recreation Commission, and hosts ice sports, basketball, rollerblading and other activities. The park portion was developed in 2004, and features a pavilion with picnic tables.

== Transportation ==
Highway 11/71 runs east to west through the township, and the community's main business area is located along the eastern section of the highway. Highway 602 runs east to west through the southern portion of Alberton, following the Rainy River from Fort Frances to Emo. Highway 611 runs north–south through the township. The municipality maintains 88 kilometres (55 mi) of roads.

== See also ==
- List of municipalities in Ontario
- List of townships in Ontario
