= Mississauga First Nation =

First Nation in Ontario, Canada

- Band No. 200
- Misswezahging
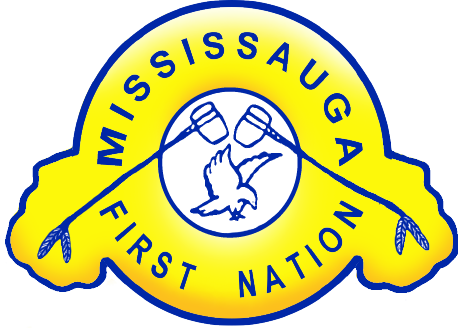
- People: Ojibwe
- Treaty: Robinson Huron
- Headquarters: P.O. Box 1299, Blind River
- Province: Ontario

Land
- Main reserve: Mississagi River 8
- Land area: 160.75 km^{2} (62.07 sq mi)

Population (2024)
- On reserve: 389
- On other land: 5
- Off reserve: 1117
- Total population: 1511

Government
- Chief: Brent Niganobe
- Council: Denise Boyer-Payette; Jubilant Sky Cada; Crystal Dawn Chiblow; Chance Counsell; Gloria Daybutch; Kenneth Macleod; Laura Mayer; Peyton Pitawanakwat; Nancy Whitehead

Tribal Council
- Anishinabek Nation; Mamaweswen, The North Shore Tribal Council

Website
- https://www.mississaugi.com/

Mississagi River 8 Misswezahging
- Indian reserve
- Mississagi River Indian Reserve No. 8
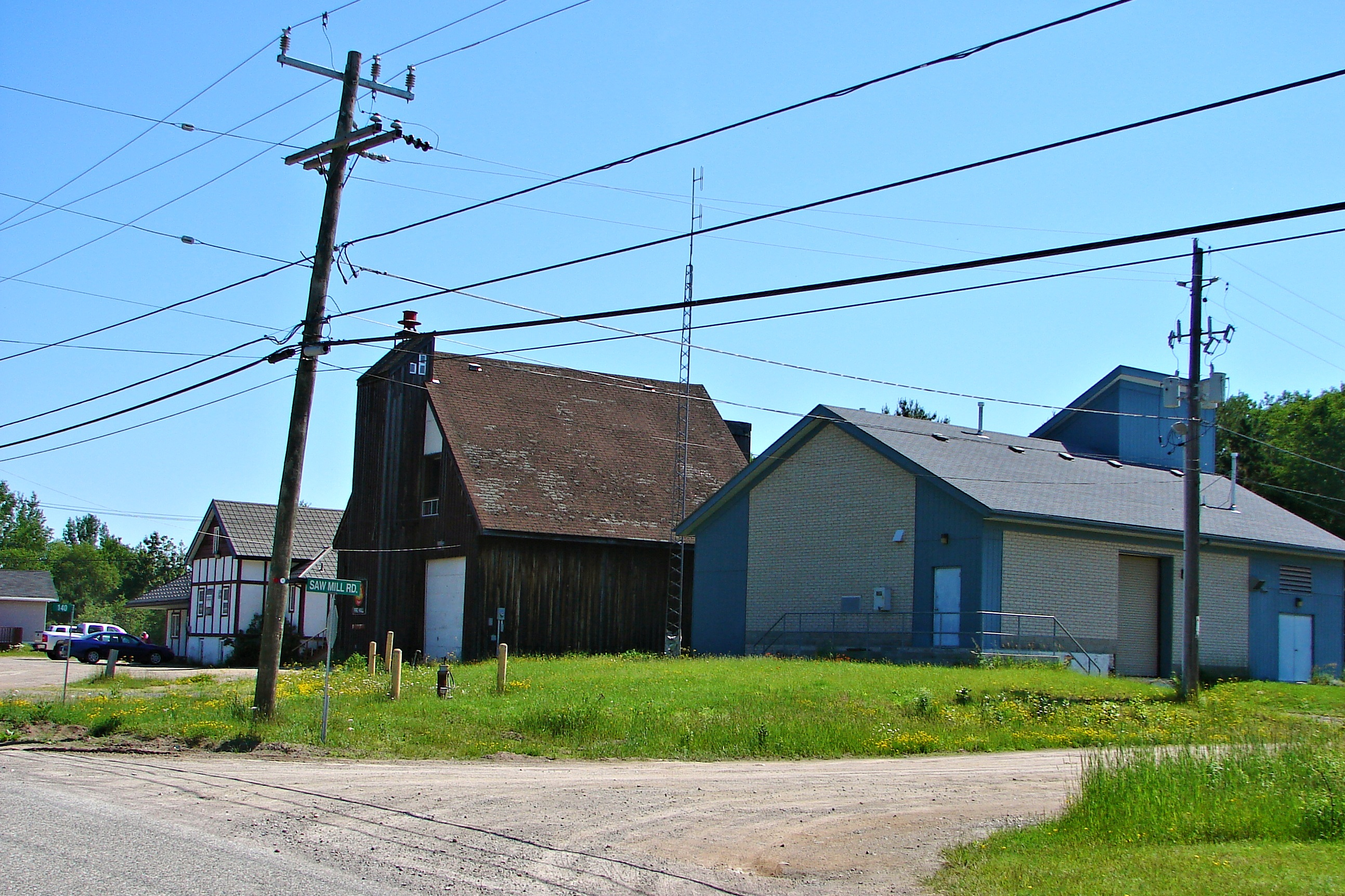

- Location within Ontario
- Coordinates: 46°13′N 83°00′W
- Country: Canada
- Province: Ontario
- District: Algoma
- First Nation: Mississauga

Area
  - Land: 18.41 km^{2} (7.11 sq mi)

Population (2011)
  - Total: 390
  - Density: 21.2/km^{2} (55/sq mi)
- Time zone: UTC-5 (EST)
  - Summer (DST): UTC-4 (EDT)
- Website: www.mississaugi.com

Mississauga First Nation, also spelt Mississaugi, is one of the six First Nations that make up the Mississauga Nations. It is located directly west of Blind River, Ontario, Canada, on the Mississagi River 8 Reserve.

== Name ==
The word Mississauga is an anglicized version of the Ojibwe word Misswezaagiing, which means ‘a river with many outlets.’ This name comes from the Mississagi River, which is a bird-foot delta, a haven for fish and waterfowl. Mississaugi is currently a jointly managed Provincial Park.

The people of Mississaugi have resided there since time immemorial.

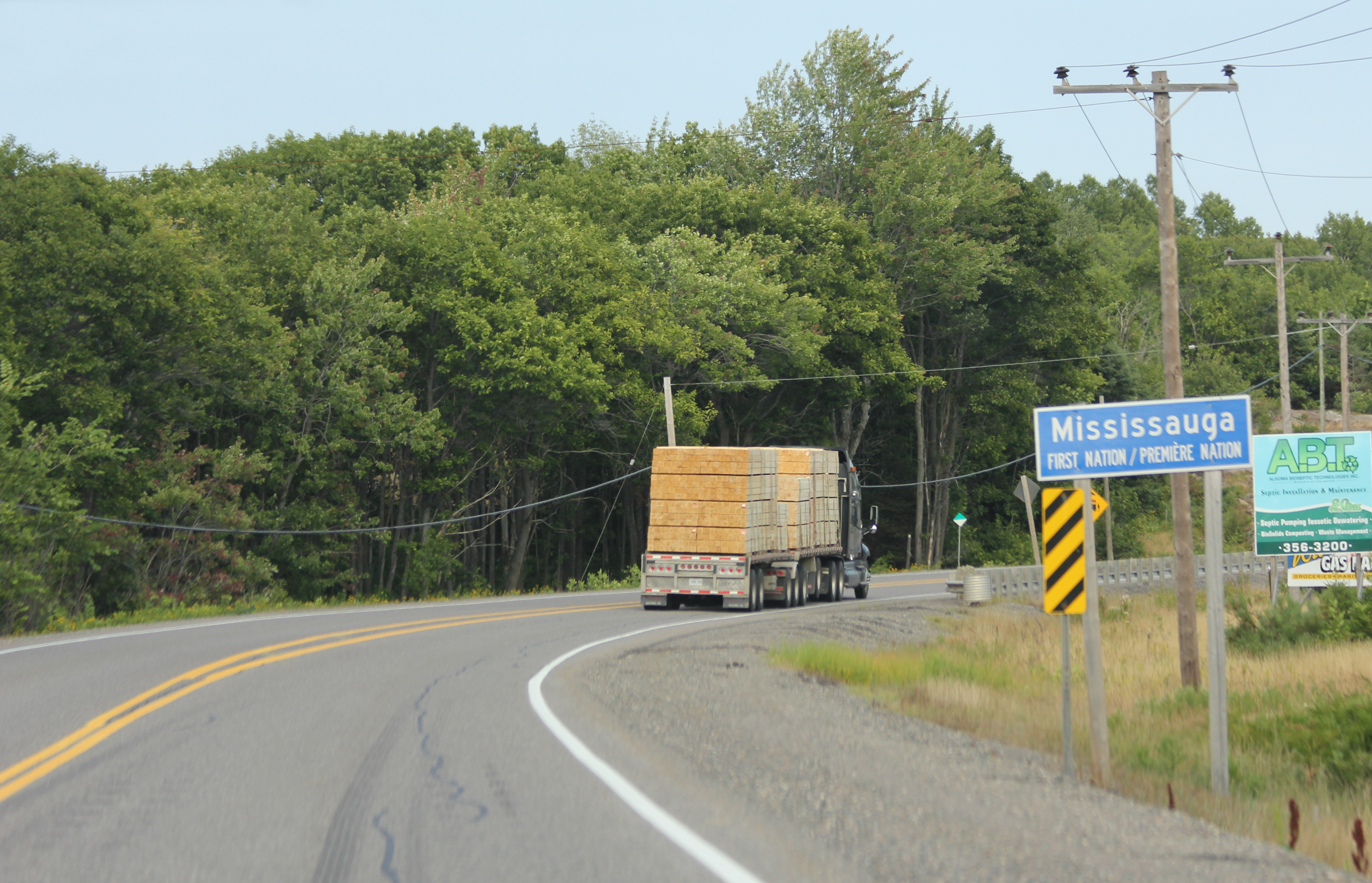
The sign for the Mississauga First Nation on Ontario Highway 17

== Governance ==
The Mississauga First Nation created a Land Code in 2019 governing land use in the community. In 2015, it also adopted the Misswezahging Constitution, which noted that the community had the "inherent right given by the Creator to enact laws necessary in order to protect and preserve Anishinaabe culture, to protect our lands, our language, customs, traditions and practices." Later, in 2019, a Community Protection Law was passed.

In October 2024, the Mississauga First Nation became the first First Nations in Canada to successfully prosecute someone based on its own legal code. A court in Elliot Lake accepted a guilty plea from an individual for trespassing and failing to comply with an order to leave the community. Police had refused to prosecute using the community's legal code, so a lawyer was hired using funds from a government pilot project for private prosecution of Indigenous communities' legal codes.

== Notable members ==
- Cecil Youngfox (1942–1987), artist
