= Whitefish Bay 34A =

- Indian reserve
- Whitefish Bay Indian Reserve No. 34A
- Location within Ontario
- Coordinates: 49°23′N 93°59′W
- Country: Canada
- Province: Ontario
- District: Kenora
- First Nation: Animakee Wa Zhing 37

Area
  - Land: 5.55 km^{2} (2.14 sq mi)

Population (2011)
  - Total: 126
  - Density: 22.7/km^{2} (59/sq mi)

Whitefish Bay 34A is a First Nations reserve on Lake of the Woods near Sioux Narrows-Nestor Falls in northwestern Ontario. It is one of the reserves of the Animakee Wa Zhing 37 First Nation.
