= Lake of the Woods (Indiana) =

Lake in Marshall County, Indiana, United States

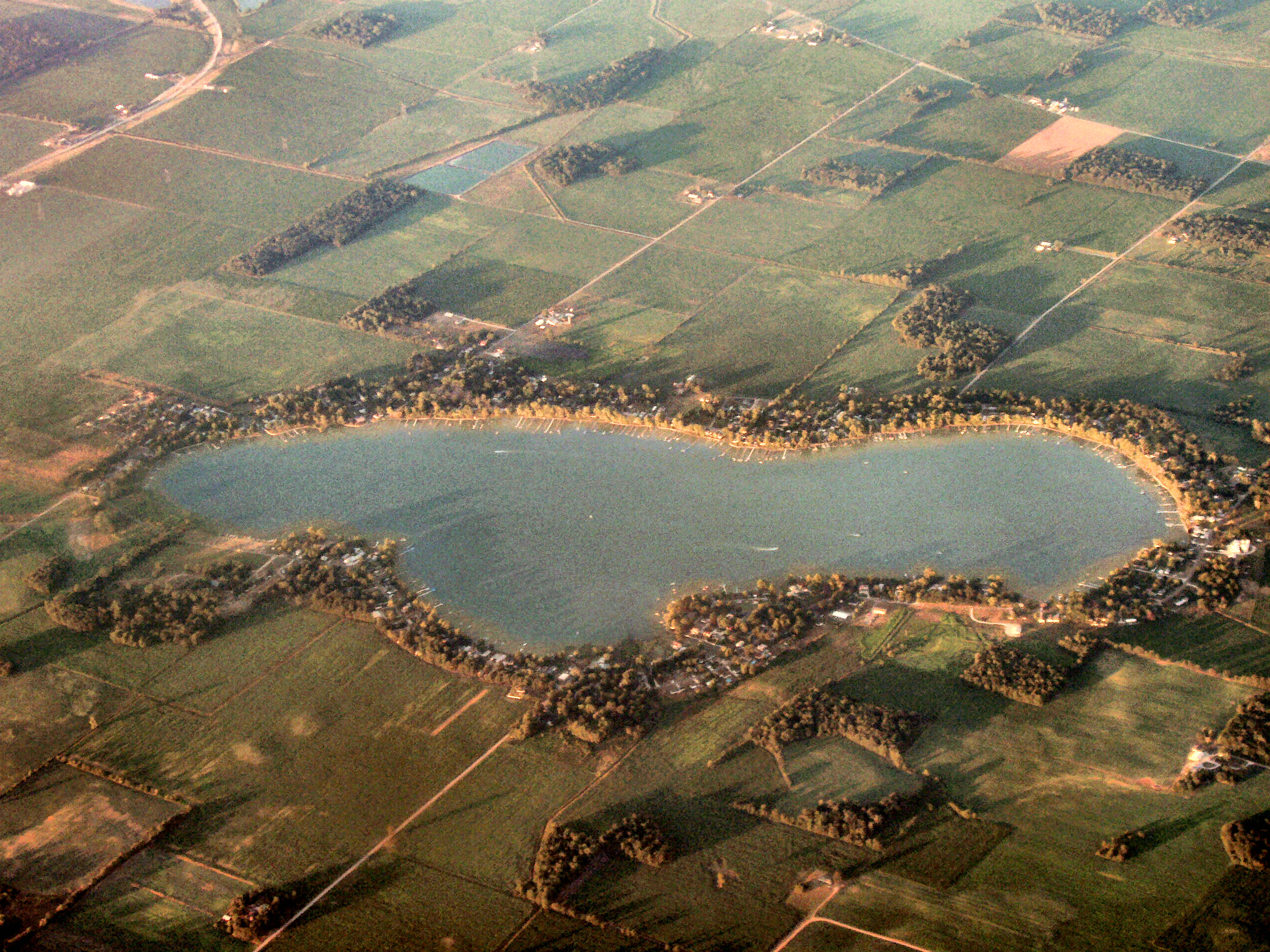

- Location within Indiana Location within the United States
- Location: German Township, Marshall County, Indiana, US
- Coordinates: 41°25′22″N 86°13′46″W
- Lake type: Glacial lake
- Basin countries: United States
- Surface area: 416 acres (168 ha)
- Average depth: 16.0 ft (4.87 m)
- Max. depth: 48.0 ft (14.63 m)
- Surface elevation: 801 ft (244 m)
- Islands: none
- Settlements: Lake of the Woods, Indiana; Surrounds the lake Bremen, Indiana (5 miles NW of the lake)

The Lake of the Woods (also known as Lake of the Wood) is a wooded lake in Marshall County, Indiana, United States, southwest of Bremen.

== See also ==
- List of lakes in Indiana
