= Lake of the Woods, Indiana =

Lakeside community in the United States

- Census-designated place
- Location within Indiana Location within the United States
- Coordinates: 41°25′27″N 86°13′44″W
- Country: United States
- State: Indiana
- County: Marshall
- Townships: German, North

Area
  - Total: 1.35 sq mi (3.5 km^{2})
  - Land: 0.69 sq mi (1.8 km^{2})
  - Water: 0.66 sq mi (1.7 km^{2})
- Elevation: 804 ft (245 m)
- Time zone: UTC-5 (EST)
  - Summer (DST): UTC-4 (EST)
- ZIP code: 46506 (Bremen)
- Area code: 574
- FIPS code: 18-41400
- GNIS feature ID: 2830459

Lake of the Woods is an unincorporated community in Marshall County, Indiana, United States. It was labeled a census-designated place (CDP) following the 2020 census.

== Geography ==
The community is in northern Marshall County, built around the natural lake of the same name. It is 4 miles (6 km) southwest of Bremen, with which it shares a ZIP Code, and 9 miles (14 km) northeast of Plymouth, the county seat.

According to the U.S. Census Bureau, the Lake of the Woods CDP has a total area of 1.35 square miles (3.50 km^{2}), of which 0.69 square miles (1.79 km^{2}) are land and 0.66 square miles (1.71 km^{2}), or 48.78%, are water. The lake drains out of its south end into Isaac Sells Ditch, which flows southeast to the Yellow River, a west-flowing tributary of the Kankakee River and part of the Illinois River watershed.

== Demographics ==
The United States Census Bureau delineated Lake of the Woods as a census designated place in the 2022 American Community Survey.
