= Lake of the Woods 34 =

- Indian reserve
- Lake of the Woods Indian Reserve No. 34
- Location within Ontario
- Coordinates: 49°19′N 94°36′W
- Country: Canada
- Province: Ontario
- District: Rainy River
- First Nation: Animakee Wa Zhing 37

Area
  - Land: 2.59 km^{2} (1.00 sq mi)

Lake of the Woods 34 is a First Nations reserve on Lake of the Woods. It is one of the reserves of the Animakee Wa Zhing 37 First Nation.
