= Serpent River First Nation =

- Band No. 201
- Genabaajing Anishinaabek
- People: Ojibwe
- Treaty: Robinson Huron
- Headquarters: 195 Village Road, Cutler
- Province: Ontario

Land
- Main reserve: Serpent River 7
- Land area: 108.79 km^{2} (42.00 sq mi)

Population (2024)
- On reserve: 375
- On other land: 27
- Off reserve: 1219
- Total population: 1621

Government
- Chief: Wilma Johnston
- Council: Shirley Ahwanaquot; Kerri Commanda; Richard Measwasige; Michelle Owl; John Trudeau

Tribal Council
- Anishinabek Nation; Mamaweswen, The North Shore Tribal Council

Website
- https://serpentriverfn.com/

Serpent River 7
- First Nations reserve
- Serpent River First Nations Reserve No. 7
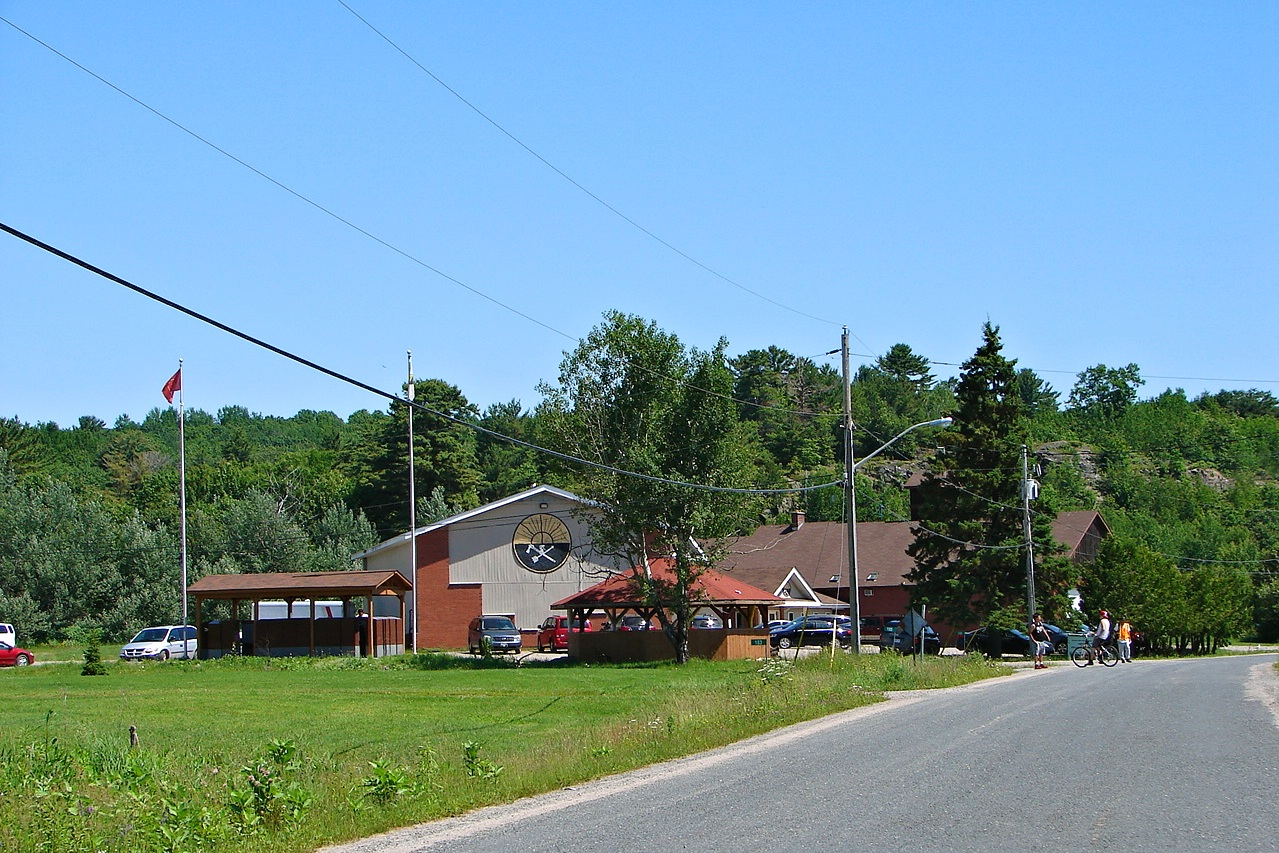

- Location within Ontario
- Coordinates: 46°11′N 82°33′W
- Country: Canada
- Province: Ontario
- District: Algoma
- First Nation: Serpent River

Area
  - Land: 79.03 km^{2} (30.51 sq mi)

Population (2011)
  - Total: 373
  - Density: 4.7/km^{2} (12/sq mi)
- Website: serpentriverfn.ca

Serpent River First Nation (Ojibwe: Genabaajing Anishinaabek), a signatory to the Robinson Huron Treaty of 1850, is an Anishinaabe First Nation in the Canadian province of Ontario, located midway between Sault Ste. Marie and Sudbury along the North Channel of Lake Huron.

The First Nation's provisional territory extends from this waters of the North Channel of Lake Huron, Serpent River Basin; north beyond the city of Elliot Lake. The Serpent River nation has a provisional land base of 5250 square kilometers. It occupies the Serpent River 7 reserve.

The First Nation was impacted significantly by uranium mining at Elliot Lake, including through contamination of the Serpent River.

== Notable members ==
- Bonnie Devine, conceptual artist, curator, filmmaker, and author
- Jesse Wente, film critic, radio personality, curator
