= Lake of the Woods 31C =

- Indian reserve
- Lake of the Woods Indian Reserve No. 31C
- Location within Ontario
- Coordinates: 49°19′N 94°48′W
- Country: Canada
- Province: Ontario
- District: Kenora
- First Nation: Naongashiing

Area
  - Land: 3.24 km^{2} (1.25 sq mi)

Lake of the Woods 31C is a First Nations reserve on Lake of the Woods, northwestern Ontario. It is one of the reserves of the Anishnaabeg of Naongashiing.
