= Anishnaabeg of Naongashiing =

First Nation band government in Ontario

The Anishnaabeg of Naongashiing (Big Island) is a First Nation band government in Ontario. They are an independent Community (1), which is a part of the Grand Council of Treaty 3. Their reserves include:

- Agency 30 (shared with 12 other First Nations)
- Big Island 31D
- Big Island 31E
- Big Island 31F
- Big Island Mainland 93
- Lake of the Woods 31B
- Lake of the Woods 31C
- Lake of the Woods 31G
- Lake of the Woods 31H
- Naongashing 31A
- Saug-a-Gaw-Sing 1
- Shoal Lake 31J
