= Rainy Lake 18C =

- Indian reserve
- Rainy Lake Indian Reserve No. 18C
- Location within Ontario
- Coordinates: 48°42′N 93°22′W
- Country: Canada
- Province: Ontario
- District: Rainy River
- First Nation: Mitaanjigamiing

Area
  - Land: 17.64 km^{2} (6.81 sq mi)

Population (2021)
  - Total: 125
  - Density: 5.3/km^{2} (14/sq mi)
- Website: www.mitaanjigamiing.ca

Rainy Lake 18C is a First Nations reserve on Rainy Lake in Rainy River District, Ontario. It is the main reserve of the Mitaanjigamiing First Nation.
