= Lake of the Woods 37B =

- Indian reserve
- Lake of the Woods Indian Reserve No. 37B
- Location within Ontario
- Coordinates: 49°19′N 94°49′W
- Country: Canada
- Province: Ontario
- District: Kenora
- First Nation: Animakee Wa Zhing 37

Area
  - Land: 1.06 km^{2} (0.41 sq mi)

Lake of the Woods 37B is a First Nations reserve in Kenora District, Ontario. It consists of an island near the Canada–United States border in Lake of the Woods. It is one of the reserves of the Animakee Wa Zhing 37 First Nation.
