= Lake of the Woods (Wyoming) =

Mountain lake in Wyoming, United States

- Location within Wyoming Location within the United States
- Location: Teton County, Wyoming, United States
- Coordinates: 44.1071°N 110.8450°W
- Basin countries: United States
- Surface elevation: 2,249 m (7,379 ft)

Lake of the Woods is a mountain lake in Wyoming, located upstream from Grassy Lake along the Ashton-Flagg Ranch road.

== Background ==
The lake lies in Targhee National Forest, between the southern border of Yellowstone National Park and the northern border of Grand Teton National Park. Primary access is from Ashton, Idaho, or Flagg Ranch, Wyoming, in the John D. Rockefeller, Jr. Memorial Parkway.

Scouting America Camp Loll is located on the lake.
