= Lake of the Woods 31H =

- Indian reserve
- Lake of the Woods Indian Reserve No. 31H
- Location within Ontario
- Coordinates: 49°07′N 94°43′W
- Country: Canada
- Province: Ontario
- District: Rainy River
- First Nation: Naongashiing

Area
  - Land: 9.64 km^{2} (3.72 sq mi)

Lake of the Woods 31H is a First Nations reserve on Big Island in Lake of the Woods, northwestern Ontario. It is one of the reserves of the Anishnaabeg of Naongashiing.
