= Rainy River District =

- District
- Location of Rainy River District in Ontario
- Coordinates: 48°50′N 92°00′W
- Country: Canada
- Province: Ontario
- Region: Northwestern Ontario
- Created: 1885

Government
  - MPs: Marcus Powlowski (Liberal)
  - MPPs: Kevin Holland (PC), Greg Rickford (PC)

Area
  - Land: 15,400.95 km^{2} (5,946.34 sq mi)
- Elevation: 328 m (1,076 ft)

Population (2021)
  - Total: 19,437
  - Density: 1.3/km^{2} (3.4/sq mi)

Time zones
- Most of the district: UTC-06:00 (Central)
  - Summer (DST): UTC-05:00 (CDT)
- Atikokan: UTC-05:00 (Eastern)
- Postal code span: P0W, P9A
- Area code: 807
- Largest communities: Fort Frances (7,952); Atikokan (2,787)

Rainy River District is a district and census division in Northwestern Ontario in the Canadian province of Ontario. It was created in 1885. It is the only division in Ontario that lies completely in the Central Time Zone, except for the township of Atikokan (including Sapawe and Kawene to the east) observing Eastern Standard Time for part of the year. Its seat is Fort Frances. It is known for its fishing and its location on the US border opposite International Falls, Minnesota, and Baudette, Minnesota.

== Subdivisions ==
Municipalities

Status	Name	Population (2011)	Mayor or Reeve
Town	Fort Frances	7,952	Andrew Hallikas
Town	Atikokan	2,787	Dennis Brown
Township	Emo	1,252	Harold McQuaker
Township	La Vallee	988	Ken McKinnon
Township	Alberton	864	Mike Ford
Town	Rainy River	842	Deborah Ewald
Township	Chapple	741	Rilla Race
Township	Dawson	563	Bill Langner
Township	Morley	474	George Heyens
Township	Lake of the Woods	296	Valerie Pizey

Unorganized area:

- Rainy River, Unorganized (served by the Eva Marion Lake local services board)

=== First Nations ===
Reserves:

- Agency 1
- Assabaska
- Big Grassy River 35G
- Big Island 31D
- Big Island 31E
- Big Island 31F
- Big Island 37
- Big Island Mainland 93
- Couchiching 16A
- Lake of the Woods 31H
- Lake of the Woods 34
- Long Sault 12
- Manitou Rapids 11
- Naongashing 31A
- Neguaguon Lake 25D
- Rainy Lake 17A
- Rainy Lake 17B
- Rainy Lake 18C
- Rainy Lake 26A
- Sabaskong Bay 35C
- Saug-a-Gaw-Sing 1
- Seine River 23A
- Seine River 23B

== Demographics ==
As a census division in the 2021 Census of Population conducted by Statistics Canada, the Rainy River District had a population of 19,437 living in 8,315 of its 10,679 total private dwellings, a change of −3.3% from its 2016 population of 20,110. With a land area of 15,400.95 km^{2} (5,946.34 sq mi), it had a population density of 1.3/km^{2} (3.3/sq mi) in 2021.

Canada census – Rainy River District community profile

	2021	2016	2011
Population	19,437 (-3.3% from 2016)	20,110 (−1.3% from 2011)	20,370 (−5.5% from 2006)
Land area	15,400.95 km^{2} (5,946.34 sq mi)	15,486.75 km^{2} (5,979.47 sq mi)	15,484.83 km^{2} (5,978.73 sq mi)
Population density	1.3/km^{2} (3.4/sq mi)	1.3/km^{2} (3.4/sq mi)	1.3/km^{2} (3.4/sq mi)
Median age	45.2 (M: 44.0, F: 46.0)	44.7 (M: 44.1, F: 45.2)
Private dwellings	10,679 (total) 8,315 (occupied)	11,217 (total)	10,792 (total)
Median household income	$78,000	$64,320

References: 2021 2016 2011

Population history of the Rainy River District

Year	Pop.	±%
1921	13,518	—
1931	17,359	+28.4%
1941	19,132	+10.2%
1951	22,132	+15.7%
1956	25,483	+15.1%
1961	26,531	+4.1%

Year	Pop.	±%
1966	25,816	−2.7%
1971	25,750	−0.3%
1976	24,768	−3.8%
1981	22,798	−8.0%
1986	22,871	+0.3%
1991	22,997	+0.6%

Year	Pop.	±%
1996	23,138	+0.6%
2001	22,109	−4.4%
2006	21,564	−2.5%
2011	20,370	−5.5%
2016	20,110	−1.3%
2021	19,437	−3.3%

Population counts are not adjusted for boundary changes.
Source: Statistics Canada

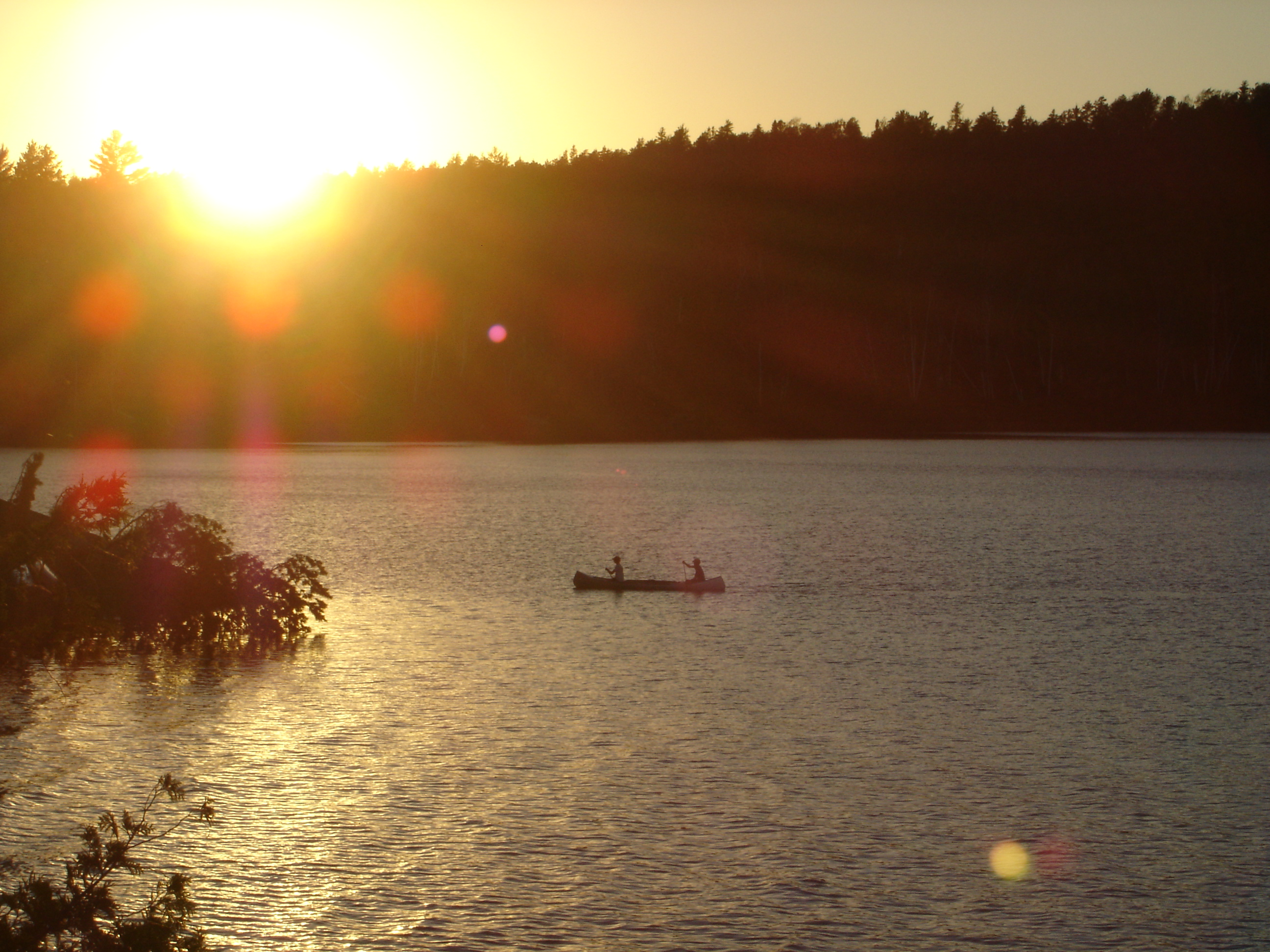
Sunset in Quetico Provincial Park

== Culture ==
As of 2013, the Rainy River District School Board has partnered with the Seven Generations Education Institute, the Ministry of Education, and local First Nations communities in development of new technologies and programs for revitalization of the Ojibwe language.

== See also ==
- List of Ontario Census Divisions
- Quetico Provincial Park
- List of townships in Ontario
- List of secondary schools in Ontario#Rainy River District
