= Lake of the Woods 31B =

- Indian reserve
- Lake of the Woods Indian Reserve No. 31B
- Location within Ontario
- Coordinates: 49°30′N 94°51′W
- Country: Canada
- Province: Ontario
- District: Kenora
- First Nation: Naongashiing

Area
  - Land: 2.94 km^{2} (1.14 sq mi)

Lake of the Woods 31B is a First Nations reserve on Lake of the Woods, northwestern Ontario. It is one of the reserves of the Anishnaabeg of Naongashiing.
