= Lake of the Woods 37 =

- Indian reserve
- Lake of the Woods Indian Reserve No. 37
- Location within Ontario
- Coordinates: 49°21′N 94°51′W
- Country: Canada
- Province: Ontario
- District: Kenora
- First Nation: Northwest Angle 37

Area
  - Land: 11.74 km^{2} (4.53 sq mi)

Population (2011)
  - Total: 46
  - Density: 3.9/km^{2} (10/sq mi)

Lake of the Woods 37 is a First Nations reserve consisting of four islands within Lake of the Woods. It is one of the reserves of the Northwest Angle 37 First Nation.

It includes Burnt Rock Island, Windfall Island, Cyclone Island and Windigo Islands.
