= Big Grassy River 35G =

- Indian reserve
- Big Grassy River Indian Reserve No. 35G
- Location within Ontario
- Coordinates: 49°04′N 94°19′W
- Country: Canada
- Province: Ontario
- District: Rainy River
- First Nation: Big Grassy

Area
  - Land: 33.73 km^{2} (13.02 sq mi)

Population (2021)
  - Total: 251
  - Density: 7.4/km^{2} (19/sq mi)

Big Grassy River 35G is a First Nations reserve on the eastern shore of Lake of the Woods in Ontario, Canada. It is one of six parcels of land reserved for the Big Grassy First Nation.
