= Rainy Lake 17A =

- Indian reserve
- Rainy Lake Indian Reserve No. 17A
- Location within Ontario
- Coordinates: 48°52′N 93°54′W
- Country: Canada
- Province: Ontario
- District: Rainy River
- First Nation: Naicatchewenin

Area
  - Land: 14.22 km^{2} (5.49 sq mi)

Population (2021)
  - Total: 234
  - Density: 16.5/km^{2} (43/sq mi)
- Website: naicatcheweninfirstnation.ca

Rainy Lake 17A is a First Nations reserve on Rainy Lake in northwestern Ontario. It is one of the reserves of the Naicatchewenin First Nation.
