= Rainy Lake 17B =

- Indian reserve
- Rainy Lake Indian Reserve No. 17B
- Location within Ontario
- Coordinates: 48°53′N 93°45′W
- Country: Canada
- Province: Ontario
- District: Rainy River
- First Nation: Naicatchewenin

Area
  - Land: 9.81 km^{2} (3.79 sq mi)

Population (2021)
  - Total: 5
  - Density: 0.5/km^{2} (1.3/sq mi)
- Website: naicatcheweninfirstnation.ca

Rainy Lake 17B is a First Nations reserve in Rainy River District, Ontario. It is one of the reserves of the Naicatchewenin First Nation.
