= Sagamok Anishnawbek First Nation =

First Nation reserve in Ontario, Canada

- Band No. 179
- People: Ojibwe, Odawa, Potawatomi
- Treaty: Robinson Huron
- Headquarters: P.O. Box 2230, Sagamok
- Province: Ontario

Land
- Main reserve: Sagamok
- Land area: 113.95 km^{2} (44.00 sq mi)

Population (2024)
- On reserve: 1615
- On other land: 28
- Off reserve: 1652
- Total population: 3295

Government
- Chief: Angus Toulouse
- Council: Anna Marie Abitong; Michael Abitong; Arnolda Bennett; Leroy Bennett; Nicole Eshkakogan; Paul Eshkakogan; Lawrence Solomon Sr. Rhonda Stoneypoint-Trudeau; Angus Toulouse; McKenzie Toulouse; Sheldon Toulouse; William Toulouse

Tribal Council
- Anishinabek Nation; Mamaweswen, The North Shore Tribal Council

Website
- https://www.sagamokanishnawbek.com/

Sagamok
- Indian reserve
- Sagamok Indian Reserve
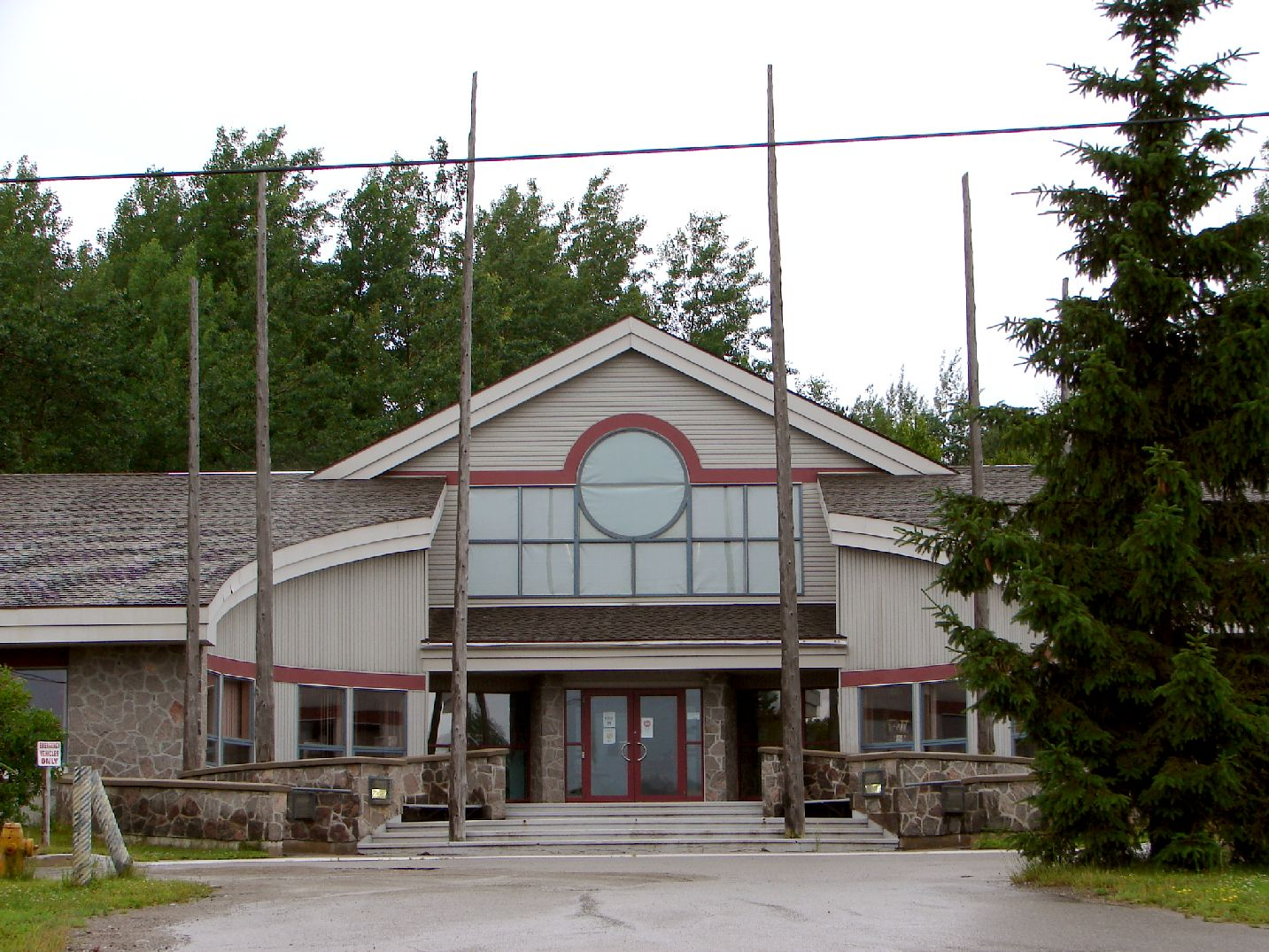
- Council building

- Location within Ontario
- Coordinates: 46°10′N 82°13′W
- Country: Canada
- Province: Ontario
- District: Algoma
- First Nation: Sagamok Anishnawbek

Government
  - Chief: Angus Toulouse

Area
  - Land: 98.72 km^{2} (38.12 sq mi)

Population (2011)
  - Total: 1,036
  - Density: 10.5/km^{2} (27/sq mi)
- Website: www.sagamok.ca

Sagamok Anishnawbek First Nation, also known as Many Rivers Joining-Human Beings, is a First Nations band government located in Ontario, Canada. Sagamok's culture and language is Anishinabek and is made up of the Ojibwe, Odawa and Pottawatomi bands. The Sagamok occupy the Sagamok reserve approximately 120 kilometres west of Sudbury, Ontario, and have a population of approximately 1650.

In the early years of Canada's development, the French relied on Sagamok's strategic location to trade with the local Anishnaabe people of that time. The French base of operations was the nearby Fort La Cloche.

== See also ==
- Kenjgewin Teg Educational Institute
