= Saug-a-Gaw-Sing 1 =

- Indian reserve
- Saug-a-Gaw-Sing Indian Reserve No. 1
- Location within Ontario
- Coordinates: 49°08′N 94°19′W
- Country: Canada
- Province: Ontario
- District: Rainy River
- First Nation: Naongashiing

Area
  - Land: 0.68 km^{2} (0.26 sq mi)

Population (2021)
  - Total: 136
  - Density: 200.9/km^{2} (520/sq mi)
- Website: www.bigisland.ca

Saug-a-Gaw-Sing 1 is a First Nations reserve on Lake of the Woods in northwestern Ontario, Canada. It is the main reserve of the Anishnaabeg of Naongashiing.
