= Dawson, Ontario =

Dawson
- Township (single-tier)
- Township of Dawson
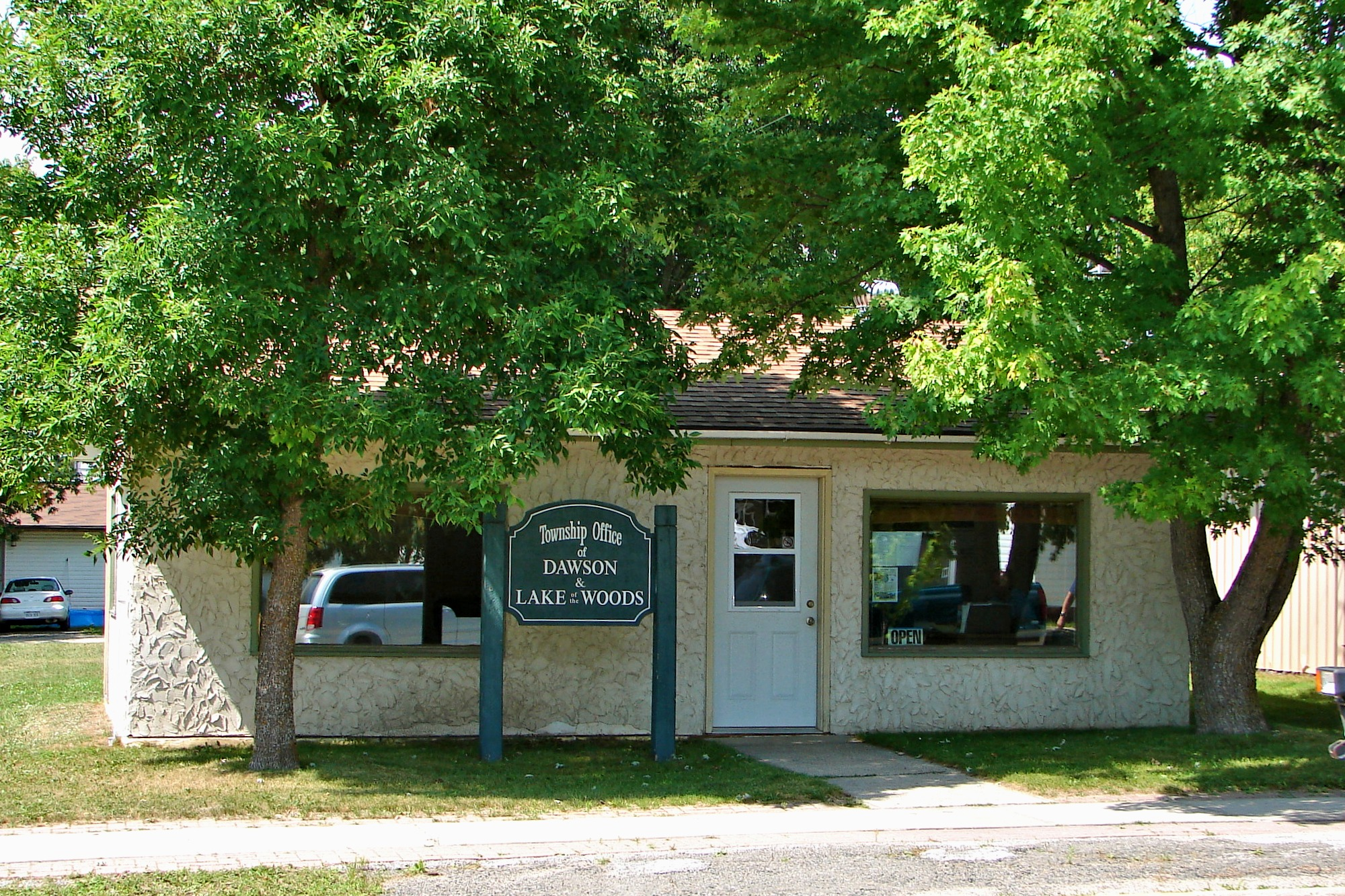
- Township office of Dawson in Rainy River

- Location within Ontario
- Coordinates: 48°45′N 94°29′W
- Country: Canada
- Province: Ontario
- District: Rainy River
- Formed: 1 January 1997

Government
  - Mayor: Douglas Hartnell
  - Fed. riding: Thunder Bay—Rainy River
  - Prov. riding: Kenora—Rainy River

Area
  - Land: 343.42 km^{2} (132.60 sq mi)
- Elevation: 335 m (1,099 ft)

Population (2021)
  - Total: 399
  - Density: 1.2/km^{2} (3.1/sq mi)
- Time zone: UTC-6 (CST)
  - Summer (DST): UTC-5 (CDT)
- Postal Code FSA: P0W 1L0
- Area code: 807
- Website: www.dawsontownship.ca

Dawson is a township located in Rainy River District in Northwestern Ontario, Canada. The township is located at the mouth of the Rainy River where it flows into Lake of the Woods.

The township was formed on 1 January 1997, when the former incorporated townships of Atwood, Blue, Dilke, and Worthington were amalgamated.

The name was chosen in order to recognize the historical Dawson Trail which was the main route of settlers moving from the east to the western part of Canada.

== Geography ==
=== Communities ===
The primary communities in the township are:

- McGinnis Creek (48°51′20″N 94°39′19″W)
- Pinewood (48°42′48″N 94°18′09″W)
- Sleeman (48°43′23″N 94°25′41″W)
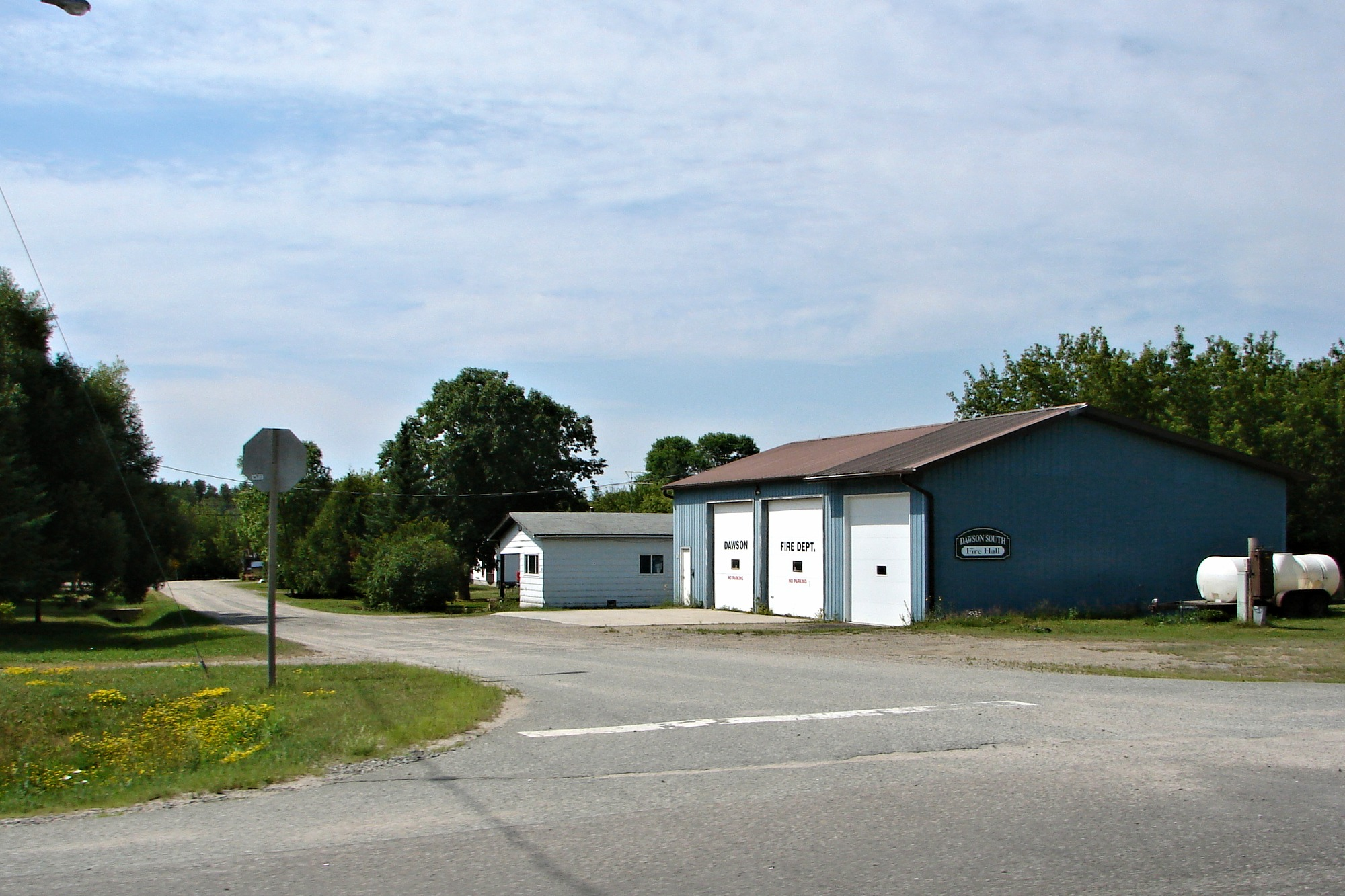
Pinewood

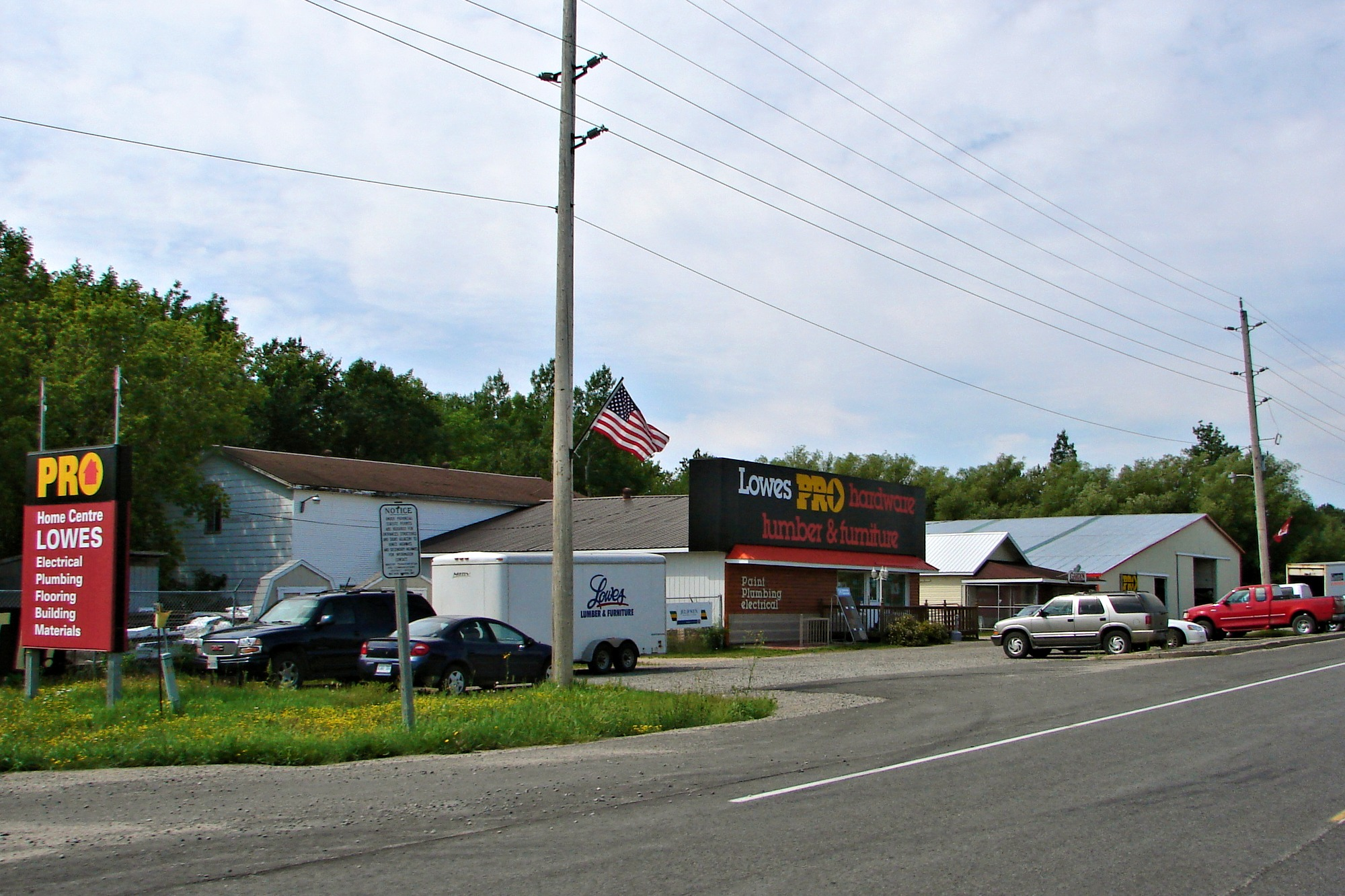
Sleeman

=== Climate ===
Climate data for Sleeman
Month	Jan	Feb	Mar	Apr	May	Jun	Jul	Aug	Sep	Oct	Nov	Dec	Year
Record high °C (°F)	7 (45)	11 (52)	16.5 (61.7)	31.5 (88.7)	32.5 (90.5)	33.5 (92.3)	35 (95)	34.5 (94.1)	34.4 (93.9)	26.7 (80.1)	22.2 (72.0)	9 (48)	35 (95)
Mean daily maximum °C (°F)	−11.4 (11.5)	−7 (19)	0.3 (32.5)	10.5 (50.9)	18.8 (65.8)	22.3 (72.1)	25 (77)	23.4 (74.1)	17.3 (63.1)	10.5 (50.9)	−0.2 (31.6)	−8.9 (16.0)	8.4 (47.1)
Daily mean °C (°F)	−17.2 (1.0)	−13.2 (8.2)	−5.6 (21.9)	4.1 (39.4)	11.8 (53.2)	16.2 (61.2)	19 (66)	17.4 (63.3)	11.8 (53.2)	5.7 (42.3)	−4.1 (24.6)	−14 (7)	2.7 (36.9)
Mean daily minimum °C (°F)	−22.9 (−9.2)	−19.3 (−2.7)	−11.4 (11.5)	−2.2 (28.0)	4.8 (40.6)	9.9 (49.8)	12.9 (55.2)	11.4 (52.5)	6.3 (43.3)	0.8 (33.4)	−8 (18)	−19.1 (−2.4)	−3.1 (26.4)
Record low °C (°F)	−44 (−47)	−41 (−42)	−37.5 (−35.5)	−27.8 (−18.0)	−8 (18)	−2 (28)	1.1 (34.0)	−1.7 (28.9)	−6 (21)	−17 (1)	−39 (−38)	−43 (−45)	−44 (−47)
Average precipitation mm (inches)	27.9 (1.10)	21.6 (0.85)	30.1 (1.19)	37.9 (1.49)	60.4 (2.38)	107.5 (4.23)	86.4 (3.40)	90.5 (3.56)	69.3 (2.73)	57.7 (2.27)	37.2 (1.46)	23.5 (0.93)	650 (25.6)
Source: Environment Canada

== Demographics ==
In the 2021 Census of Population conducted by Statistics Canada, Dawson had a population of 399 living in 190 of its 274 total private dwellings, a change of −14.7% from its 2016 population of 468. With a land area of 343.42 km^{2} (132.60 sq mi), it had a population density of 1.2/km^{2} (3.0/sq mi) in 2021.

Canada census – Dawson community profile

	2021	2016	2011
Population	399 (-14.7% from 2016)	468 (-16.9% from 2011)	563 (-9.2% from 2006)
Land area	343.42 km^{2} (132.60 sq mi)	339.5 km^{2} (131.1 sq mi)	338.35 km^{2} (130.64 sq mi)
Population density	1.2/km^{2} (3.1/sq mi)	1.4/km^{2} (3.6/sq mi)	1.7/km^{2} (4.4/sq mi)
Median age	56.4 (M: 57.6, F: 53.6)	54.5 (M: 54.9, F: 53.5)	47.8 (M: 49.1, F: 46.2)
Private dwellings	274 (total) 190 (occupied)	292 (total)	307 (total)
Median household income	$75,000	$61,312

References: 2021 2016 2011

Historical census populations – Dawson, Ontario
Year	Pop.	±%
1996	631	—
2001	613	−2.9%
2006	620	+1.1%
2011	563	−9.2%
2016	468	−16.9%
2021	399	−14.7%
Source: Statistics Canada

== See also ==
- List of townships in Ontario
