= Big Island Mainland 93 =

- Indian reserve
- Big Island Mainland Indian Reserve No. 93
- Location within Ontario
- Coordinates: 49°05′N 94°18′W
- Country: Canada
- Province: Ontario
- District: Rainy River
- First Nation: Anishnaabeg of Naongashiing

Area
  - Land: 0.42 km^{2} (0.16 sq mi)

Population (2021)
  - Total: 5
  - Density: 11.8/km^{2} (31/sq mi)
- Website: www.bigisland.ca

Big Island Mainland 93 is a First Nations reserve of the Anishnaabeg of Naongashiing located near Lake of the Woods in Ontario, Canada.
