= Seine River 23B =

- Indian reserve
- Seine River Indian Reserve No. 23B
- Location within Ontario
- Coordinates: 48°40′N 92°46′W
- Country: Canada
- Province: Ontario
- District: Rainy River
- First Nation: Seine River

Area
  - Land: 10.26 km^{2} (3.96 sq mi)

Population (2021)
  - Total: 0
  - Density: 0/km^{2} (0/sq mi)
- Website: seineriverfirstnation.ca

Seine River 23B is a First Nations reserve in northwestern Ontario, Canada. It is one of three reserves of the Seine River First Nation.
