= Ontario Highway 71 =

Ontario provincial highway

Highway 71

- Highway 71 highlighted in red

Route information
- Maintained by Ministry of Transportation of Ontario
- Length: 194.1 km (120.6 mi)
- Existed: September 1, 1937–present

Major junctions
- South end: US 53 / US 71 at the U.S. border in Fort Frances
- Highway 11 from Fort Frances to Chapple
- North end: Highway 17 near Kenora

Location
- Country: Canada
- Province: Ontario
- Major cities: Fort Frances, Emo, Sioux Narrows, Kenora

Highway system
- Ontario provincial highways; Current; Former; 400-series
| ← Highway 69 | → Highway 72 |
Former provincial highways
| ← Highway 70 |

King's Highway 71, commonly referred to as Highway 71, is a provincially maintained highway in the Canadian province of Ontario. The 194-kilometre-long (121 mi) route begins at the Fort Frances–International Falls International Bridge in Fort Frances, continuing from US Highway 53 (US 53) and US 71 in Minnesota, and travels west concurrently with Highway 11 for 40 kilometres (25 mi) to Chapple. At that point, Highway 11 continues west while Highway 71 branches north and travels 154 kilometres (96 mi) to a junction with Highway 17 just east of Kenora. Highway 71 forms a branch of the Trans-Canada Highway for its entire length, with the exception of the extremely short segment south of Highway 11 in Fort Frances.

The current routing of Highway 71 was created out of a route renumbering that took place on April 1, 1960, to extend Highway 11 from Thunder Bay to Rainy River. The portion of the highway that is concurrent with Highway 11 follows the Cloverleaf Trail, constructed by the end of 1880s and improved over the next several decades. The portion between Highway 11 and Highway 17 follows the Heenan Highway, constructed to connect the Rainy River region with Kenora and the remainder of Ontario's road network; before its opening, the area was accessible only from across the United States border. Both highways were incorporated into the provincial highway system in 1937 following the merger of the Department of Highways (DHO) and the Department of Northern Development.

== Route description ==
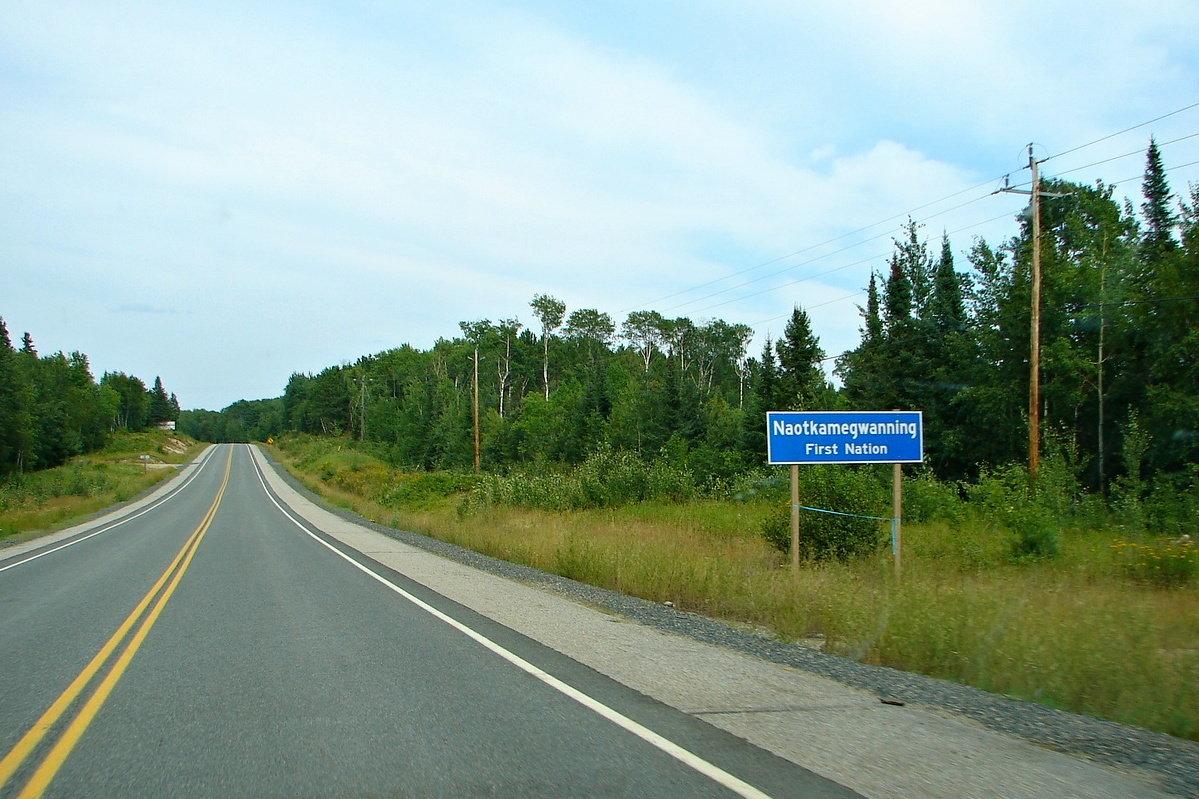
Highway 71 at the Naotkamegwanning First Nation near Sioux Narrows

Highway 71 connects the Rainy River region with the Trans-Canada Highway near Kenora. The first 65 kilometres (40 mi) of the highway traverses the largest pocket of arable land in northern Ontario. Following that, the route suddenly enters the Canadian Shield, where the land is unsuitable for agricultural development.

The highway begins at the international bridge in Fort Frances; within the United States, the road continues south as US 53 and US 71 in Minnesota. From the bridge, it proceeds along Central Avenue, encountering Highway 11 one block north. The two routes travel north concurrently to 3 Street West, where both turn west. At the Fort Frances Cemetery, the route branches southwest and exits Fort Frances after splitting with the Colonization Road (Highway 602). It follows the old Cloverleaf Trail west through Devlin, where it intersects Highway 613, and Emo, where it merges with the Colonization Road. Approximately six kilometres (3.7 mi) west of Emo, in the Manitou Rapids First Nations Reserve, Highway 71 branches north, while Highway 11 continues west to Rainy River.

North of the Manitou Rapids Reserve, Highway 71 presses through a large swath of land mostly occupied by horse and cattle ranches. It intersects Highway 600 and Highway 615, both of which have historical connections to Highway 71. The highway passes through Finland and enters the Boreal Forest, descending into the Canadian Shield over the course of a kilometre and a half (approximately one mile). From this point to its northern terminus, the highway crosses through rugged and isolated terrain, curving around lakes, rivers and mountains on its northward journey. It passes through the community of Caliper Lake before crossing between Rainy River District and Kenora District midway between there and Nestor Falls.

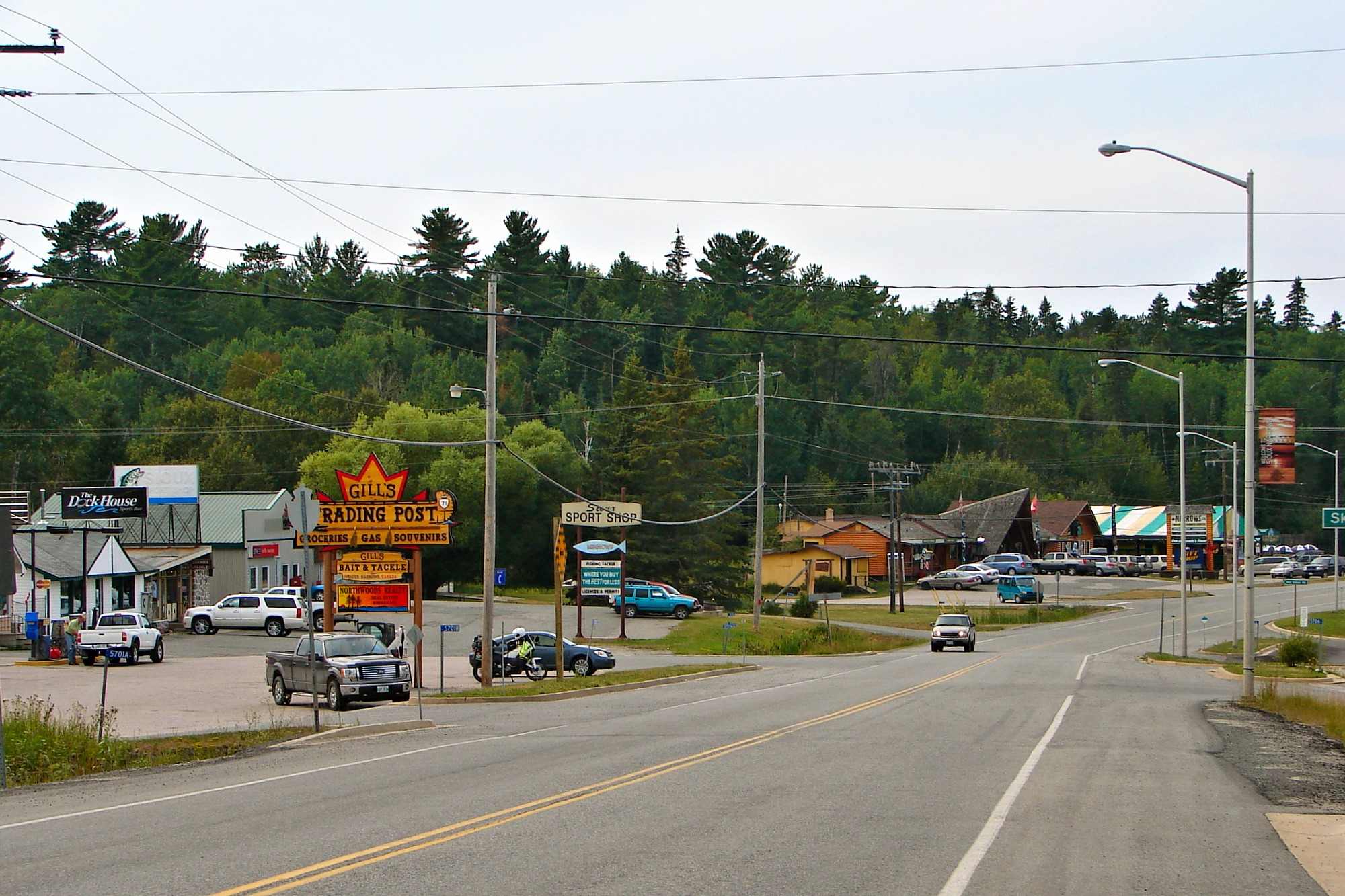
Highway 71 at Sioux Narrows

North of Nestor Falls, the highway travels along the eastern shore of Lake of the Woods, providing access to the community of Crow Lake on the Sabaskong Bay 35D reserve of the Ojibways of Onigaming First Nation between Lake of the Woods and Kakagi Lake, as well as to the Whitefish Bay 32A reserve of the Naotkamegwanning First Nation immediately southeast of Sioux Narrows. Here the route crosses the Sioux Narrows Bridge, the last part of the highway to be constructed and a formidable engineering obstacle in the 1930s. North of Sioux Narrows, the highway meanders northward through an uninhabited region, zigzagging among the numerous lakes that dot Kenora District and crossing the Black River. It provides access to Eagle Dogtooth and Rushing River Provincial Parks several kilometres south of its northern terminus at Highway 17, four kilometres (2.5 mi) east of the split with Highway 17A and 20 kilometres (12 mi) east of downtown Kenora.

== History ==
Highway 71 was created out of a renumbering of several highways in the Rainy River District during the late 1950s as Highway 11 was extended west of Thunder Bay. The history of the route is tied to the two major highways in Rainy River District: the Cloverleaf Trail and the Heenan Highway.

The Cloverleaf Trail, the older of the two roads, was initially developed as the Rainy River colonization road. A line was blazed as early as 1875, possibly as part of the Dawson Trail, and improved in 1885 into a trail. This initial trail followed the Rainy River west from Fort Frances to Lake of the Woods; Highway 602 now follows the road between Fort Frances and Emo. In 1911, James Arthur Mathieu was elected as a Member of Provincial Parliament (MPP) in the Rainy River riding. As a lumber merchant, Mathieu promoted improved road access in the region. Between 1911 and 1915, he oversaw construction of the gravel Cloverleaf Trail between Fort Frances and Rainy River.

Highway 71 overlooking Lake of the Woods in 1939

The Heenan Highway would become the first Canadian link to the Rainy River area; before its opening in the mid-1930s, the only way to drive to the area was via the United States. In 1922, Kenora MPP Peter Heenan and Dr. McTaggart approached the government to lobby for construction of a road between Nestor Falls and Kenora. Nestor Falls was the northernmost point accessible by road from the Rainy River area. Heenan would become the Minister of Lands and Forests in Mitch Hepburn's cabinet. This provided the impetus for construction to begin in 1934. Unlike the Cloverleaf Trail, the Fort Frances – Kenora Highway, as it was known prior to its opening, was constructed through the rugged terrain of the Canadian Shield. Rocks, forests, lakes, muskeg, and insects served as major hindrances during construction of the 100-kilometre-long (62 mi) highway, which progressed from both ends. By late 1935, the only remaining gap in the road was the Sioux Narrows Bridge. Construction on this bridge was underway by March 1936; it was rapidly assembled using old-growth Douglas fir from British Columbia (BC) as the main structural members. These timbers were cut in BC, and shipped to be built on-site like a jig-saw puzzle. The bridge was finished on June 15, 1936, completing the link between Fort Frances and Kenora.

On July 1, 1936, Premier Mitch Hepburn attended a ceremony in front of the Rainy Lake Hotel in Fort Frances. On a rainy afternoon, at 5:30 p.m., Peter Heenan handed Hepburn a pair of scissors with which to cut the ribbon crossing the road and declare the highway open. Hepburn, addressing the crowd that was gathered, asked "What would you say if we call it the Heenan Highway, what would you think of that?". The crowd cheered and Hepburn cut the ribbon.

The Cloverleaf Trail and the Heenan Highway were assumed by the DHO shortly after its merger with the Department of Northern Development. Following the merger, the DHO began assigning trunk roads throughout northern Ontario as part of the provincial highway network. Highway 71 was assigned on September 1, 1937, along the Cloverleaf Trail. The portion of the Heenan Highway lying within Kenora District was designated as Highway 70 on the same day. The portion within Rainy River District was designated as Highway 70 on September 29.

Sioux Narrows Bridge in 1951

The original route of Highway 70 split in two south of Finland; Highway 70 turned east to Off Lake Corner, then south to Emo, while Highway 70A turned west to Black Hawk then south to Barwick. The northern end of the highway was also concurrent with Highway 17 for 21.7 kilometres (13.5 mi) into Kenora, and the southern end concurrent with Highway 71 for 37.0 kilometres (23.0 mi) between Emo and Fort Frances. During 1952, the highway was extended south from its split to Highway 71, midway between Barwick and Emo. By 1953, the new road was opened and informally designated as the new route of Highway 70. The old routes were decommissioned on February 8, and the new route designated several weeks later on March 10, 1954. Both forks were later redesignated as Highway 600 and Highway 615.

Throughout the mid- to late 1950s, a new highway was constructed west from Thunder Bay towards Fort Frances. Initially this road was designated as Highway 120. In 1959, it was instead decided to make this new link a westward extension of Highway 11; a major renumbering took place on April 1, 1960: Highway 11 was established between Rainy River and Fort Frances, Highway 71 was truncated west of the Highway 70 junction, and the entirety of Highway 70 was renumbered as Highway 71. This established the current routing of the highway.

Although now rebuilt as a steel structure, the original Sioux Narrows Bridge was considered to be the longest single span wooden bridge in the world, at 64 metres (210 ft). The original bridge remained in place until 2003, when an engineering inspection revealed that 78% of the structure had failed. A temporary bridge was erected while a new structure was built. The new bridge was completed in November 2007, incorporating the old timber truss as a decorative element. A ribbon cutting ceremony to dedicate the bridge was held on July 1, 2008, 72 years after the original dedication by Mitch Hepburn.

== Major intersections ==
The following table lists the major junctions along Highway 71, as noted by the Ministry of Transportation of Ontario.

| Division | Location | km | mi | Destinations | Notes |
|---|---|---|---|---|---|
| Rainy River | | 0.00 | 0.00 | US 53 south / US 71 south – International Falls | Continuation into Minnesota |
| Rainy River | | 0.00 | 0.00 | Fort Frances–International Falls International Bridge; Canada–US border | |
| Rainy River | Fort Frances | 0.1 | 0.062 | Highway 11 east / TCH – Thunder Bay | Southern end of Highway 11 concurrency; southern end Trans-Canada Highway designation (continues on Highway 11 east) |
| Rainy River | Fort Frances | 2.2 | 1.4 | Highway 602 (Colonization Road) – Emo | |
| Rainy River | Devlin | 21.3 | 13.2 | Highway 613 – Northwest Bay | |
| Rainy River | Emo | 34.0 | 21.1 | Highway 602 (Colonization Road) – Fort Frances | |
| Rainy River | Chapple | 40.2 | 25.0 | Highway 11 west – Rainy River | Northern end of Highway 11 concurrency |
| Rainy River | Chapple | 58.6 | 36.4 | Highway 600 west – Black Hawk; Highway 615 east – Off Lake Corner | |
| Kenora | Sioux Narrows | 139.3 | 86.6 | Sioux Narrows Bridge | |
| Kenora | Unorganized Kenora District | 174.0 | 108.1 | Andy Lake Road | |
| Kenora | Unorganized Kenora District | 194.1 | 120.6 | Highway 17 / TCH – Kenora, Dryden, Thunder Bay | |
1.000 mi = 1.609 km; 1.000 km = 0.621 mi: Concurrency terminus; Route transition

Trans-Canada Highway
| Previous route Highway 17 | Highway 71 | Next route Highway 11 |
