= Ontario Highway 70 =

Former Ontario provincial highway

Highway 70

Route information
- Maintained by Ministry of Transportation of Ontario
- Length: 15.1 km (9.4 mi)
- Existed: April 22, 1965–April 1, 1997
- History: Earlier routing: September 1, 1937–April 1, 1960

Major junctions
- South end: Highway 6 / Highway 21 near Owen Sound
- North end: Highway 6 north in Hepworth

Location
- Country: Canada
- Province: Ontario

Highway system
- Ontario provincial highways; Current; Former; 400-series
← Highway 69	→ Highway 71

King's Highway 70, commonly referred to as Highway 70, was a provincially maintained highway in the Canadian province of Ontario, which provided a shorter route from Highway 6 and Highway 21 in Springmount to Highway 6 in Hepworth. The route, which now forms part of Highway 6, was 15.1 kilometres (9.4 mi) long and travelled in a southeast–northwest direction west of Owen Sound. The route followed an early trail blazed by deputy surveyor Charles Rankin in 1842 that was upgraded to a modern road in the 1920s. Highway 70 was designated in 1965 and renumbered as Highway 6 in 1997. Another Highway 70 existed near Kenora between 1937 and 1959 before being renumbered as Highway 71. This designation was applied along the newly opened Heenan Highway, shortly after the Department of Highways (DHO) began numbering routes in northern Ontario. However, a series of renumberings in 1960 led to the entire length becoming part of Highway 71.

== Route description ==
Highway 70 was a short highway that travelled in a northeast–southwest direction between the communities of Springmount, near Owen Sound, and Hepworth. The 15.1 km (9.4 mi) route, now part of Highway 6, passes through an equal mixture of farmland and forests, aside from the community of Shallow Lake, located at approximately the midpoint of the route. At its southern terminus is the only wrong-way concurrency in Ontario, between Highway 6 and Highway 21. The road continues south of the intersection between these highways as Grey County Road 18, which serves as a bypass of Owen Sound. At its northern terminus, the route curves to the west and enters Hepworth; Highway 70 ended at the intersection of Queen Street and Bruce Street. From there, Highway 6 continued north through the Bruce Peninsula.

== History ==
=== Rainy River–Kenora ===
The Highway 70 designation was first used along the Heenan Highway, connecting the Rainy River region to Kenora to provide the first Canadian road link to an area previously accessible only from the United States. In 1922, Kenora MPP Peter Heenan and Dr. McTaggart approached the government to lobby for construction of a road between Nestor Falls and Kenora. Nestor Falls was the northernmost point accessible by road from the Rainy River area. Heenan would become the Minister of Lands and Forests in Mitch Hepburn's cabinet. This provided the impetus for construction to begin in 1934. Unlike previously built roads in the area, the Fort Frances – Kenora Highway, as it was known prior to its opening, was constructed through the rugged terrain of the Canadian Shield. Rocks, forests, lakes, muskeg, and insects served as major obstacles during construction of the 100-kilometre (62 mi) highway, which progressed from both ends. By late 1935, the only remaining gap in the road was the Sioux Narrows Bridge. Construction on this bridge was underway by March 1936; it was rapidly assembled using Douglas fir from British Columbia as the main structural members. The bridge was completed on June 15, 1936, completing the link between Fort Frances and Kenora.

Sioux Narrows Bridge in 1951

On July 1, 1936, premier Mitch Hepburn attended a ceremony in front of the Rainy Lake Hotel in Fort Frances. On a rainy afternoon, at 5:30 p.m., Peter Heenan handed Hepburn a pair of scissors with which to cut the ribbon crossing the road and declare the highway open. Hepburn, addressing the crowd that was gathered, asked "What would you say if we call it the Heenan Highway, what would you think of that?". The crowd cheered and Hepburn cut the ribbon.

The Heenan Highway was assumed by the DHO shortly after its merger with the Department of Northern Development. Following the merger, the DHO begin assigning trunk roads throughout northern Ontario as part of the provincial highway network. The portion lying within Kenora District was designated as Highway 70 on September 1, while the portion within Rainy River District was designated on September 29.

The original route of Highway 70 split in two south of Finland; Highway 70 turned east to Off Lake Corner, then south to Emo, while Highway 70A turned west to Black Hawk then south to Barwick. The northern end of the highway was also concurrent with Highway 17 for 21.7 kilometres (13.5 mi) into Kenora, and the southern end concurrent with Highway 71 for 37.0 kilometres (23.0 mi) between Emo and Fort Frances. During 1952, the highway was extended south from its split to Highway 71, midway between Barwick and Emo. By 1953, the new road was opened and informally designated as the new route of Highway 70. The old routes were decommissioned on February 8, and the new route designated on March 10, 1954.

Throughout the mid to late 1950s, a new highway was constructed west from Thunder Bay towards Fort Frances. Initially this road was designated as Highway 120. In 1959, it was instead decided to make this new link a westward extension of Highway 11; a major renumbering took place on April 1, 1960: Highway 11 was established between Rainy River and Fort Frances, Highway 71 was truncated west of the Highway 70 junction, and the entirety of Highway 70 was renumbered as Highway 71.

Current Highway 6, and former Highway 70, facing northwest towards Shallow Lake.

=== Bruce Peninsula ===
On April 22, 1965, the DHO recycled the Highway 70 designation, providing a shorter route for traffic between the Bruce Peninsula and Owen Sound. The new highway followed an existing Grey County road through Shallow Lake - the Southwest Diagonal. It was surveyed in 1854 by Ontario's deputy surveyor, Charles Rankin, to provide a short route between the undeveloped Sydenham (now Owen Sound) and Hepworth townsites. This route passed through a large swamp and as a result remained an unimproved one lane trail up until the 1920s. By the time the road was designated as a provincial highway in the 1960s, it was a paved two lane route. The route remained in service for just short of 32 years, remaining unchanged aside from minor curve alignment improvements and rehabilitation. On April 1, 1997, the route of Highway 6 south of Hepworth to Highway 21 was decommissioned as a provincial highway. The entire length of Highway 70 was subsequently renumbered as part of Highway 6 to rectify the resulting discontinuity.

== Major intersections ==
The following table lists the major junctions along Highway 70, as noted by the Ministry of Transportation of Ontario. This table covers the routing of Highway 70 between 1965 and 1997; for the iteration near Kenora see Highway 71

Division	Location	km	mi	Destinations	Notes
Grey	Springmount	0.0	0.0	Highway 6 / Highway 21 – Owen Sound	
Grey	Cruickshank	6.4	4.0	Sideroad 10	
Grey	Shallow Lake	10.2	6.3	County Road 170 (Cruickshank Street)	
Bruce	Hepworth	15.1	9.4	Highway 6 (Bruce Street) – Wiarton	Locally known as Queen Street
1.000 mi = 1.609 km; 1.000 km = 0.621 mi
