= 2014 Rainy River District municipal elections =

Elections were held in the organized municipalities in the Rainy River District of Ontario on October 27, 2014 in conjunction with municipal elections across the province.

== Alberton ==
Reeve Candidate	Vote	%
Michael Hammond (X)	Acclaimed	

== Atikokan ==
Mayoral Candidate	Vote	%
Dennis Brown (X)	822	78.81
Robert Davidson	221	21.19

== Chapple ==
Reeve Candidate	Vote	%
Peter Van Heyst (X)	Acclaimed	

== Dawson ==
Mayoral Candidate	Vote	%
Linda Armstrong	161	70.61
Eltjo Wiersema (X)	67	29.39

== Emo ==
Mayoral Candidate	Vote	%
Jack Siemens	345	65.71
Vincent Sheppard (X)	180	34.29

== Fort Frances ==
Mayoral Candidate	Vote	%
Roy Allan Avis (X)	1,459	48.91
Andrew Hallikas	1,118	37.48
Dan Onichuk	406	13.61

== Lake of the Woods ==
Mayoral Candidate	Vote	%
Valerie Pizey (X)	Acclaimed	

== La Vallee ==
Reeve Candidate	Vote	%
Ken McKinnon	214	67.72
Ross Donaldson (X)	102	32.28

== Morley ==
Reeve Candidate	Vote	%
George Heyens	144	80.00
Tyler Nordin	36	20.00

== Rainy River ==
Mayoral Candidate	Vote	%
Deborah Ewald (X)	218	64.50
Brent Anderson	120	35.50
