= Ontario Highway 622 =

Ontario provincial highway

Highway 622
- Bending Lake Road

Route information
- Maintained by Ministry of Transportation of Ontario
- Length: 129.1 km (80.2 mi)
- History: Established January 30, 1958; Extended 1979–89

Major junctions
- North end: Highway 17 / TCH 35 km west of Ignace
- South end: Highway 11B in Atikokan

Location
- Country: Canada
- Province: Ontario
- Counties: Rainy River, Kenora
- Major cities: Atikokan, Ignace

Highway system
- Ontario provincial highways; Current; Former; 400-series
← Highway 621	→ Highway 623

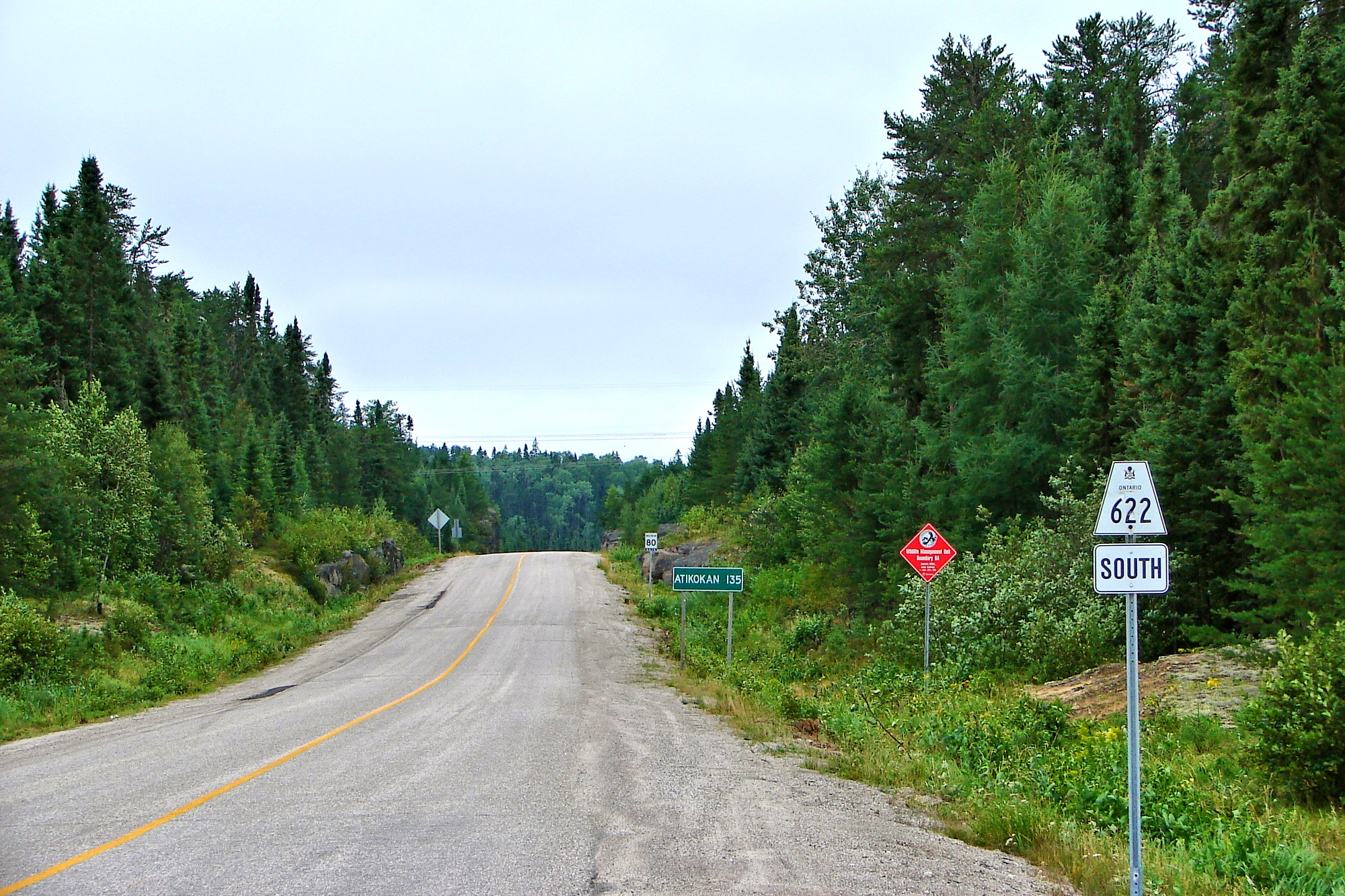
The north end of Highway 622.

Secondary Highway 622, commonly referred to as Highway 622, is a provincially maintained secondary highway in the Canadian province of Ontario. It is a long connecting route between Highways 11 and Highway 17 in Northwestern Ontario. The road is connected to Highway 11 by the 3 km-long spur road Highway 11B in Atikokan.

The road was built through the 1980s, with crews working from Highway 11 and Highway 17, meeting in the middle in 1988. It was opened to traffic in September 1989 and renumbered as Highway 622. During its construction, it was known as Bending Lake Road and was designated as Highway 807.

== Route description ==
Highway 622 is a long and desolate highway in northwestern Ontario that connects Highway 11 and Highway 17 via Highway 11B. Aside from Atikokan, at the southern end of the route, there are no communities, residences or establishments along the entire 129.1 km (80.2 mi) route. A handful of logging roads branch off the highway, but otherwise no through routes intersect it between its two termini. At its southern end, the route begins by branching off east from Highway 11B as it enters into Atikokan from the south. Highway 622 curves around the east side of the town for 1.5 km (0.93 mi) then proceeds generally northwest into the wilderness. Between there and its northern terminus at Highway 17 between Dryden and Ignace, the route passes through a lake dotted region covered by rock and forest; the boreal forest and the Canadian Shield.

According to the Ministry of Transportation (MTO), on an average day, approximately 600 vehicles travel Highway 622 within Atikokan, while approximately 100 travel the highway near its northern terminus. These represent the heaviest and least travelled sections of the route.

== History ==
Highway 622 was first created in 1958 as an access road from Atikokan to the newly opened Caland Ore mine. It was assumed by the Department of Highways, predecessor to the modern Ministry of Transportation, on January 30, 1958 at a length of approximately 8 km (5 mi). The gravel-surfaced highway was paved over the next two years, but otherwise remained the same until the late 1970s.

In 1979, construction began on the Bending Lake Road under the Northern Economic Development Program. Contracts were tendered for clearing the route from Highway 17 southerly and the existing Highway 622 northerly, as well as for the grading of 17.5 km (10.9 mi) of the route midway between the two. The southern end of this work was 43 km (27 mi) north of Highway 622. The latter job was completed by the following year. In 1980, work began on grading a new route from the end of an existing development road which branched off of Highway 622 north for 17 km (11 mi), which was completed during the summer of 1981. In 1982, contracts were awarded for grading a 13.1 km (8.1 mi) road north from 60.5 km (37.6 mi) north of Highway 622.

By 1984, the remaining 18 km (11 mi) between the southern and middle sections were graded, and structures completed over the Seine River and Little Turtle River. The Bending Lake Road had also been designated as Highway 807. Contracts were awarded that year for construction of a structure over the Turtle River and for a further 5.5 km (3.4 mi) of grading from 73.6 km (45.7 mi) north of Highway 622 northerly. By the summer of 1985, 77 km (48 mi) of the road was graded and all three major river crossings completed. Contracts were awarded to begin grading the route 9 km (5.6 mi) southerly from Highway 17, and for the installation of guide rails along the completed sections. The former of these two contracts was completed by the following summer, at which point another contract was tendered for grading another 10.6 km (6.6 mi) southward. This was followed in 1987 with a contract for an additional 11.3 km (7.0 mi) of the northern section. Finally, in 1988, three contracts were tendered to complete the highway: the first was to grade the remaining 11.7 km (7.3 mi) of the route; the remaining two were to pave the entire route. The Bending Lake Road was opened in 1989 and renumbered as Highway 622. The route has remained unchanged since then.

For several years in the late 1990s and early 2000s, the highway became used by trucking traffic as an alternative to Ontario Highway 71, after load restrictions were placed on the Sioux Narrows Bridge.

== Major intersections ==
The following table lists the major junctions along Highway 622. In addition, it includes some minor junctions that are noted by the Ministry of Transportation of Ontario.

Division	Location	km	Destinations	Notes
Rainy River	Atikokan	0.0	Highway 11B south (to Highway 11)	
Rainy River	Unorganized Rainy River District	4.0	Hardydam Road / Rawn Reservoir Road	
Rainy River	Unorganized Rainy River District	7.5	Highway 7177 west (Font Hill Timber Road)	
Rainy River	Unorganized Rainy River District	30.5	Gravel Road (west); Dashwa Lake Road (east)	
Kenora	Unorganized Kenora District	68.2	Sedgewick Lake Road	
Kenora	Unorganized Kenora District	84.8	Big Turtle River bridge	
Kenora	Unorganized Kenora District	129.1	Highway 17 – Dryden, Thunder Bay	Trans-Canada Highway
1.000 mi = 1.609 km; 1.000 km = 0.621 mi
