= Cedartree Lake =

Lake in Ontario, Canada

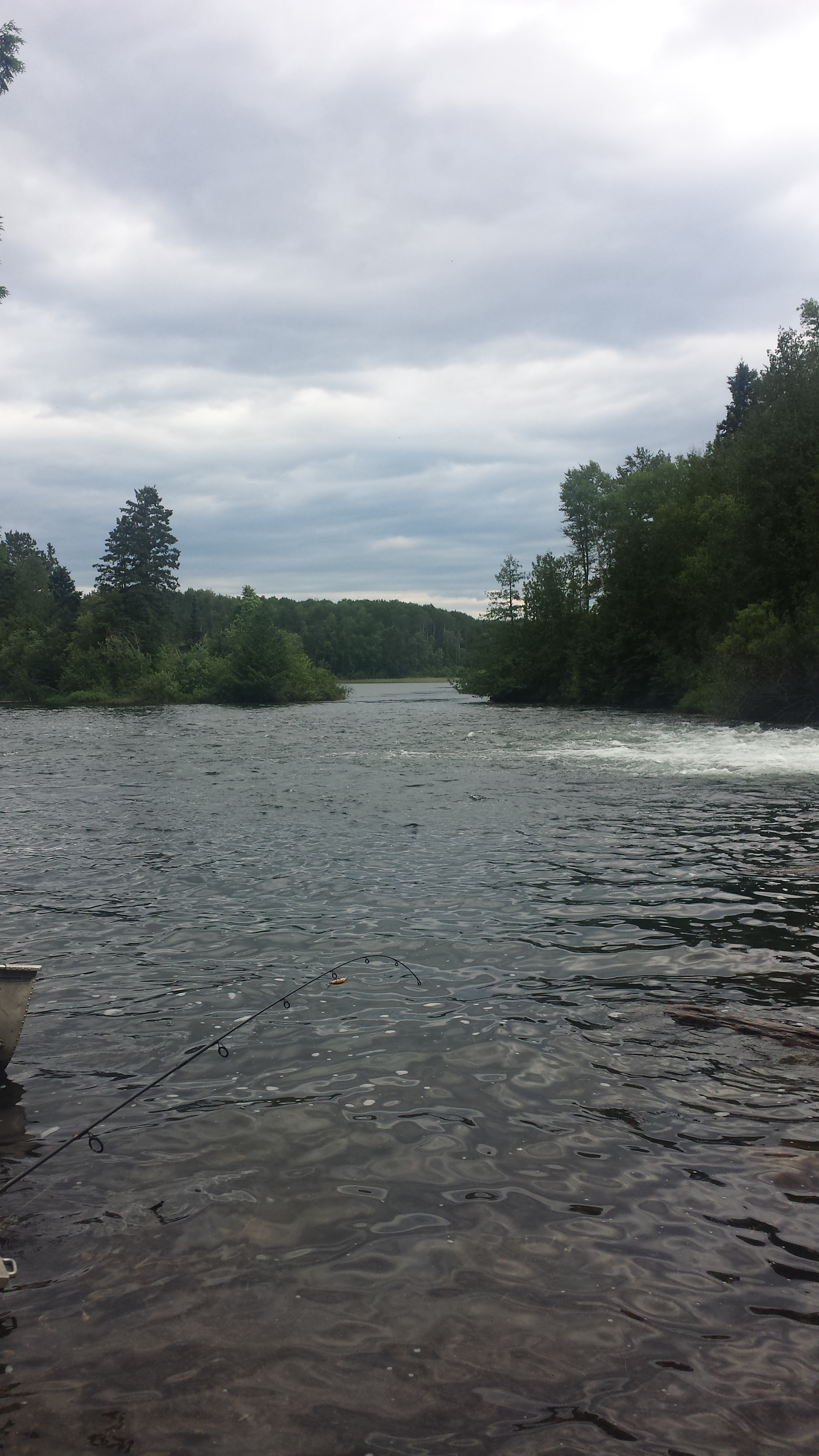
- Cedartree Lake during summer

- Location within Ontario
- Location: Northern Ontario
- Coordinates: 49°18′N 93°51′W
- Basin countries: Canada

Cedartree Lake, is a lake just north of Nestor Falls, Ontario, Canada, in the township of Sioux Narrows-Nestor Falls and is fed by Kakagi Lake. It is also feeds Lake of the Woods through a series of lakes starting with Flint Lake.

== See also ==
- List of lakes in Ontario
