= Whitefish Bay, Ontario =

Whitefish Bay, Ontario may refer to one of two First Nations in Canada:

- Lac Seul First Nation near Sioux Lookout
- Naotkamegwanning First Nation near Sioux Narrows
