= List of secondary highways in Rainy River District =

List of Ontario secondary highways

This is a list of secondary highways in Rainy River District, most of which serve isolated and sparsely populated areas in the Rainy River District of northwestern Ontario.

== Highway 600 ==
Highway 600

Route information
- Maintained by Ministry of Transportation of Ontario
- Length: 86.4 km (53.7 mi)

Major junctions
- West end: Rainy River north limits, north of Highway 11
- Highway 617; Highway 619; Highway 621
- East end: Highway 71 / TCH near Black Hawk

Location
- Country: Canada
- Province: Ontario
- Districts: Rainy River District
- Towns: Rainy River

Highway system
- Ontario provincial highways; Current; Former; 400-series
← Highway 599	→ Highway 601

Provincial Highway 600 is a secondary highway in the Canadian province of Ontario. Its total length is 86.4 kilometres (53.7 mi). Its western terminus is Highway 11 in Rainy River, and its eastern terminus is at Highway 71. It is also one of only a few Ontario highways that are still gravel.

== Highway 602 ==
Highway 602

Route information
- Maintained by Ministry of Transportation of Ontario
- Length: 44.6 km (27.7 mi)

Major junctions
- West end: Highway 11 / Highway 71 / TCH in Emo
- Highway 613; Highway 611
- East end: Fort Frances west limits at Oakwood Road

Location
- Country: Canada
- Province: Ontario
- Districts: Rainy River District
- Towns: Emo, Fort Frances

Highway system
- Ontario provincial highways; Current; Former; 400-series
← Highway 601	→ Highway 603

Highway 602 is a secondary highway in the Canadian province of Ontario. Its total length is 44.6 kilometres (27.7 mi). Its western terminus is Highway 11 in Emo, and its eastern terminus is at Highway 71 in Fort Frances.

== Highway 613 ==
Highway 613

Route information
- Maintained by Ministry of Transportation of Ontario
- Length: 39.9 km (24.8 mi)

Major junctions
- South end: Highway 602 at Big Fork
- Highway 11
- North end: Dead end at Lake Despair government dock near Naicatchewenin First Nation

Location
- Country: Canada
- Province: Ontario
- Districts: Rainy River District
- Towns: Big Fork, Devlin, Burriss, and Government Landing

Highway system
- Ontario provincial highways; Current; Former; 400-series
← Highway 612	→ Highway 614

Secondary Highway 613 is a secondary highway in the Canadian province of Ontario. Its total length is 39.9 kilometres (24.8 mi). Its northern terminus is near Hope Lake and the Northwest Bay First Nation Reserve, and its southern terminus is at Highway 602.

== Highway 615 ==
Highway 615

Route information
- Maintained by Ministry of Transportation of Ontario
- Length: 21.3 km (13.2 mi)
- Existed: May 9, 1956–present

Major junctions
- South end: Highway 71 / TCH near Off Lake Corner
- North end: Dead end at Clearwater Lake

Location
- Country: Canada
- Province: Ontario
- Districts: Thunder Bay District
- Towns: Off Lake Corner, Burditt Lake

Highway system
- Ontario provincial highways; Current; Former; 400-series
← Highway 614	→ Highway 617
Former provincial highways
Highway 616 →

Secondary Highway 615, commonly referred to as Highway 615, is a secondary highway in the Canadian province of Ontario, located in Rainy River District. The route connects Highway 71 (the Trans-Canada Highway) with Burditt Lake and Clearwater Lake. It is 21.3 kilometres (13.2 mi) in length. Highway 615 was assumed in early 1956.

== Highway 633 ==
Highway 633

Route information
- Maintained by Ministry of Transportation of Ontario
- Length: 5.1 km (3.2 mi)
- Existed: October 29, 1959–present

Major junctions
- South end: Highway 11 / TCH approximately 30 km (20 mi) east of Atikokan
- North end: Dead end at Kawene flag stop

Location
- Country: Canada
- Province: Ontario
- Districts: Rainy River District
- Towns: Kawene

Highway system
- Ontario provincial highways; Current; Former; 400-series
← Highway 632	→ Highway 634

Secondary Highway 633, commonly referred to as Highway 633, is a secondary highway in the Canadian province of Ontario, located in Rainy River District. The route begins at Highway 11, the Trans-Canada Highway, approximately 30 kilometres (20 mi) east of Atikokan. It travels north for 5.1 kilometres (3.2 mi) to the village of Kawene, ending at a flag stop on the Canadian National Railway.

Highway 633 was assumed by the Department of Highways, predecessor to the modern Ministry of Transportation, on October 29, 1959. It has remained unchanged since then.
