= Yellow Girl Bay 32B =

- Indian reserve
- Yellow Girl Bay Indian Reserve No. 32B
- Location within Ontario
- Coordinates: 49°30′N 94°12′W
- Country: Canada
- Province: Ontario
- District: Kenora
- First Nation: Naotkamegwanning

Area
  - Land: 18.02 km^{2} (6.96 sq mi)

Yellow Girl Bay 32B is a First Nations reserve in Kenora District, Ontario. It is one of the reserves of the Naotkamegwanning First Nation.
