= Kakagi Lake =

Lake in Kenora District, Ontario, Canada

- Crow Lake
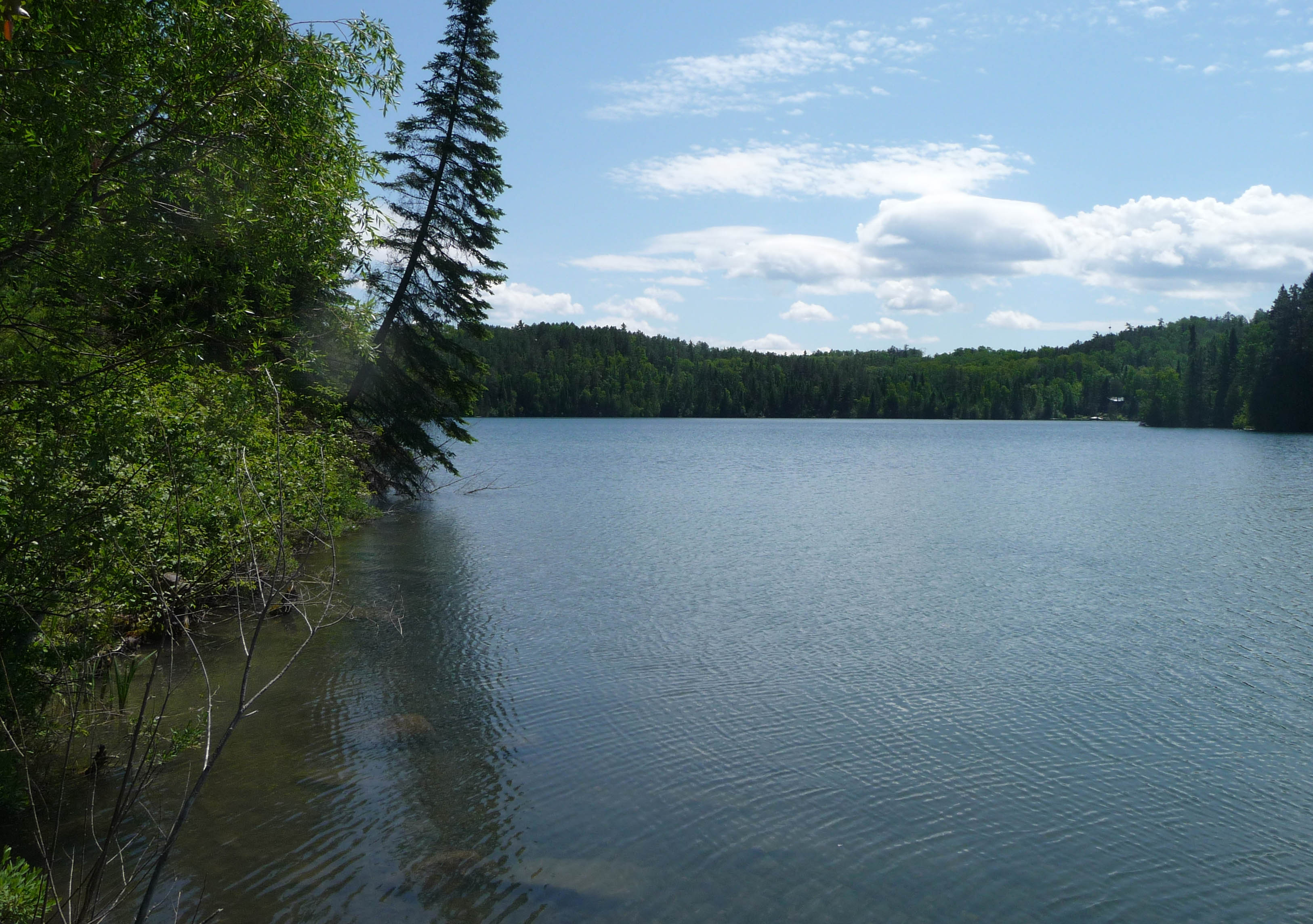

- Location in Ontario
- Location: Kenora District, Ontario
- Coordinates: 49°14′27″N 93°49′57″W
- Part of: Hudson Bay drainage basin
- Basin countries: Canada
- Max. length: 24 km (15 mi)
- Max. width: 13.5 km (8.4 mi)
- Surface area: 110.8 km^{2} (42.8 sq mi)
- Average depth: 20.7 m (68 ft)
- Max. depth: 54.9 m (180 ft)
- Surface elevation: 337 m (1,106 ft)

Kakagi Lake, also known as Crow Lake, is a lake in both Unorganized Kenora District and the township of Sioux Narrows-Nestor Falls, Kenora District, in Northwestern Ontario, Canada. It is just north of the community of Nestor Falls, and right across Ontario Highway 71 from Stevens Bay on Lake of the Woods. It also feeds Lake of the Woods through a series of lakes starting with Cedartree Lake.

== Geography ==
It is a body of water that is essentially not charted, and caution must be taken when navigating this body of water. Kakagi Lake is approximately 110.8 square kilometres (42.8 sq mi) in size, about 24 kilometres (15 mi) long and up to 13.5 kilometres (8.4 mi) wide. It is 337 m (1,106 ft) above sea level with an average depth 20.7 metres (68 ft) and a maximum depth of 54.9 metres (180 ft). The lake has many islands such as Gold Point Island, Green Island, Mink Island, Bear-Beaver Island, Alora Island, Mosquito Point Island and Pine Island. There are several spots on the lake frequented by campers as well as several natural recreational areas such as Jumping Rock, Seagull Rock and Soft Sand Beach.

There are a small number of private cabins mostly on Young's Bay, and several commercial fishing lodges and resorts. In winter, Kakagi is the gateway to a system of lakes and portages that stretches almost 60 kilometres (37 mi) east of Nestor Falls by snowmobile. Young's Bay is named after Clyde Young who came to Canada from Chicago in 1932 and was founder of Crow Lake Camp.

The Ojibways of Onigaming First Nation lay claim to much of Kakagi Lake; their Sabaskong Bay 35D reserve is on the southwest shore of the lake.

The lake also has a history of gold mining.

== Natural history ==
Kakagi lake is well known for its lake trout fishing because of its many spawning reefs throughout the lake and deep water basins equally well distributed. Musky, smallmouth bass, northern pike and lake whitefish also inhabit Kakagi. Kagaki's forage fish include perch, rock bass, cisco, lake shiners and a variety of other minnow species.

== Recreation ==
=== Canoe Route ===
There is a popular canoe route known as the Kakagi Lake-Cameron Lake canoe route. The loop is considered of moderate difficulty and starts and ends at Kakagi. Native pictographs and bald eagles exist on Stephen Lake. The length is 51 km and typically takes 4 days across 5 portages. The route typically starts at the Government Dock (49°12.583′N 93°57.963′W), and moves north for 11 kilometres (6.8 mi) to Emm Bay. Then move north through a narrows and then 1 kilometre (0.62 mi) until the first portage to Cedartree Lake. The portage is 125 metres (410 ft) long (49°18.537′N 93°53.347′W). Then follow the west shore of Cedartree Lake into the river and continue the length of the river until the portage to Flint Lake. The portage is 225 metres (738 ft) long (49°19.631′N 93°51.897′W) and passes over Cameron Lake Road. Next follow the rest of the river into Flint Lake and then go to the south shore until the next portage into Stephen Lake via Cameron Creek. The portage is 100 metres (330 ft) long and is located on the east side of Cameron Creek. Move east down Stephen Lake via the narrows. The pictographs are found just after the narrows and to the left just around the bay. Move to the east on Stephen Lake into the bay until the portage to Cameron Lake via Cameron Creek. The portage is 400 metres (1,300 ft) long (49°17.78′N 93°45.3′W) and follows a small creek to the south of the trail. Next move into Bog Bay through the narrows and into Cameron Lake and then follow the south shore for 7 kilometres (4.3 mi) to the most southeasterly end of the lake to the portage back into Kakagi Lake. The portage is 2,500 metres (8,200 ft) long (49°14.261′N 93°41.238′W). Once on Kakagi Lake, follow the north shore, heading west for about 7 kilometres (4.3 mi) the continue west back to the Government dock for 12 kilometres (7.5 mi).

== Popular culture ==
Although the book is set in Northern Ontario, Crow Lake is not actually about Kakagi (Crow) Lake.

== See also ==
- List of lakes in Ontario
