= Naotkamegwanning First Nation =

Coordinates: 49°24′14″N 93°53′35″W

Naotkamegwanning First Nation, formerly known as Whitefish Bay First Nation and known in the Ojibwe language as Ne-adikamegwaning (Of the Whitefish Point), is an Ojibwe Nation in the Treaty 3 territory, 90.4 km (56 mi) from Kenora, Ontario and is near Sioux Narrows, Ontario of Lake of the Woods.

The total registered population in September, 2010, was 1177, of which the on-reserve population was 713. The First Nation is a member of the Kenora Chiefs Advisory and part of Grand Council Treaty 3

== Governance ==
Naotkamegwanning First Nation is currently governed by Chief Gary Tom and 3 Councillors: Willow Crow, Calvin Joseph, and Linda Namaypoke. (since 2024)

== Reserves ==
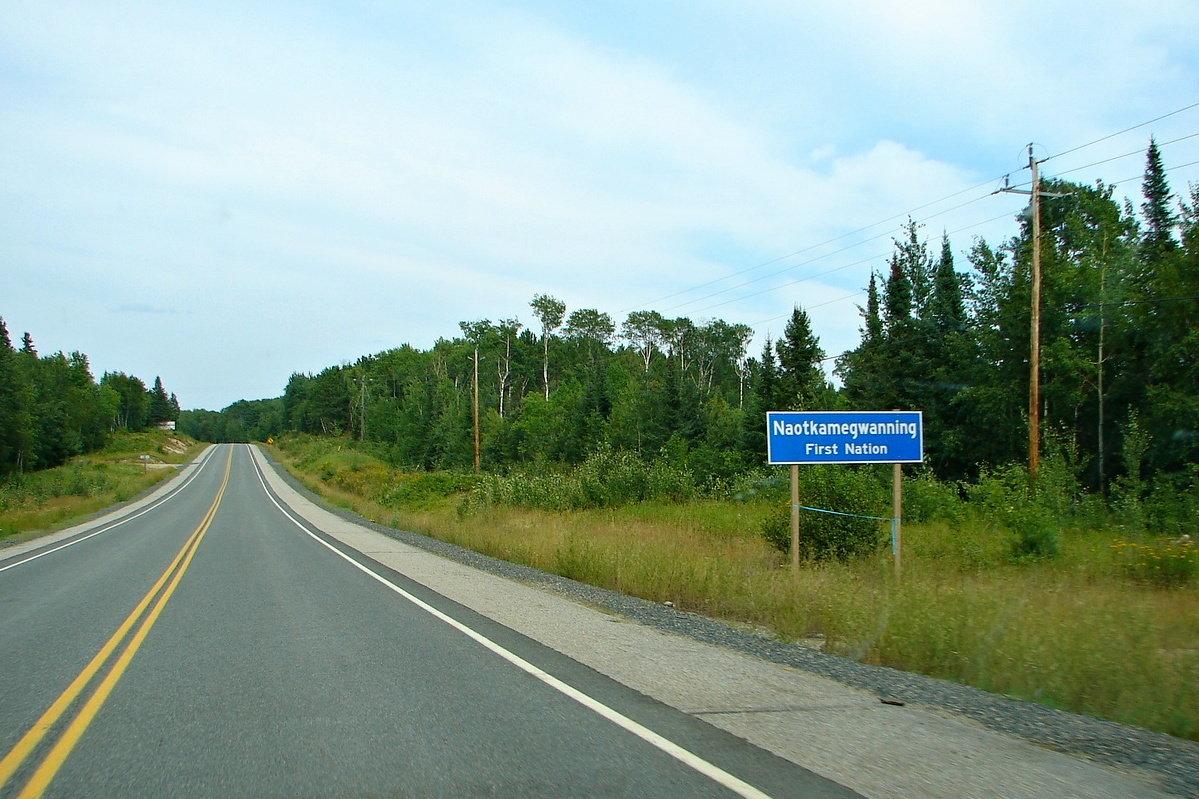
Whitefish Bay 32A reserve along Ontario Highway 71

The First Nation have reserved for themselves four reserves:

- 1954.3 ha Whitefish Bay 32A Indian Reserve, which serves as their main Reserve
- 1802.5 ha Yellow Girl Bay 32B Indian Reserve
- 518 ha Sabaskong Bay 32C Indian Reserve
- 379 ha Agency 30 Indian Reserve, which is shared with 12 other First Nations.
