= Whitefish Bay 32A =

- Indian reserve
- Whitefish Bay Indian Reserve No. 32A
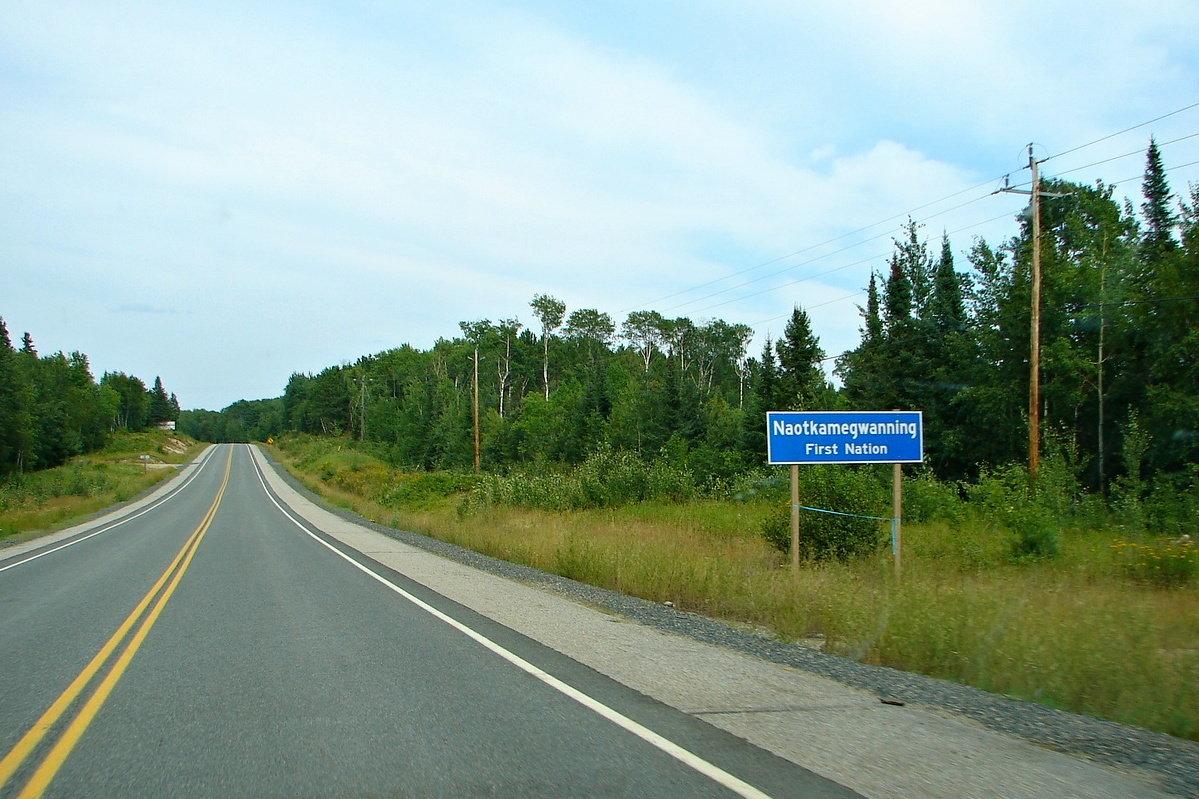

- Location within Ontario
- Coordinates: 49°24′N 93°54′W
- Country: Canada
- Province: Ontario
- District: Kenora
- First Nation: Naotkamegwanning

Area
  - Land: 18.77 km^{2} (7.25 sq mi)

Population (2011)
  - Total: 670
  - Density: 35.7/km^{2} (92/sq mi)

Whitefish Bay 32A is a First Nations reserve on Lake of the Woods near Sioux Narrows-Nestor Falls in northwestern Ontario. It is the main reserve of the Naotkamegwanning First Nation.
