= Sabaskong Bay 35D =

- Indian reserve
- Sabaskong Bay Indian Reserve No. 35D
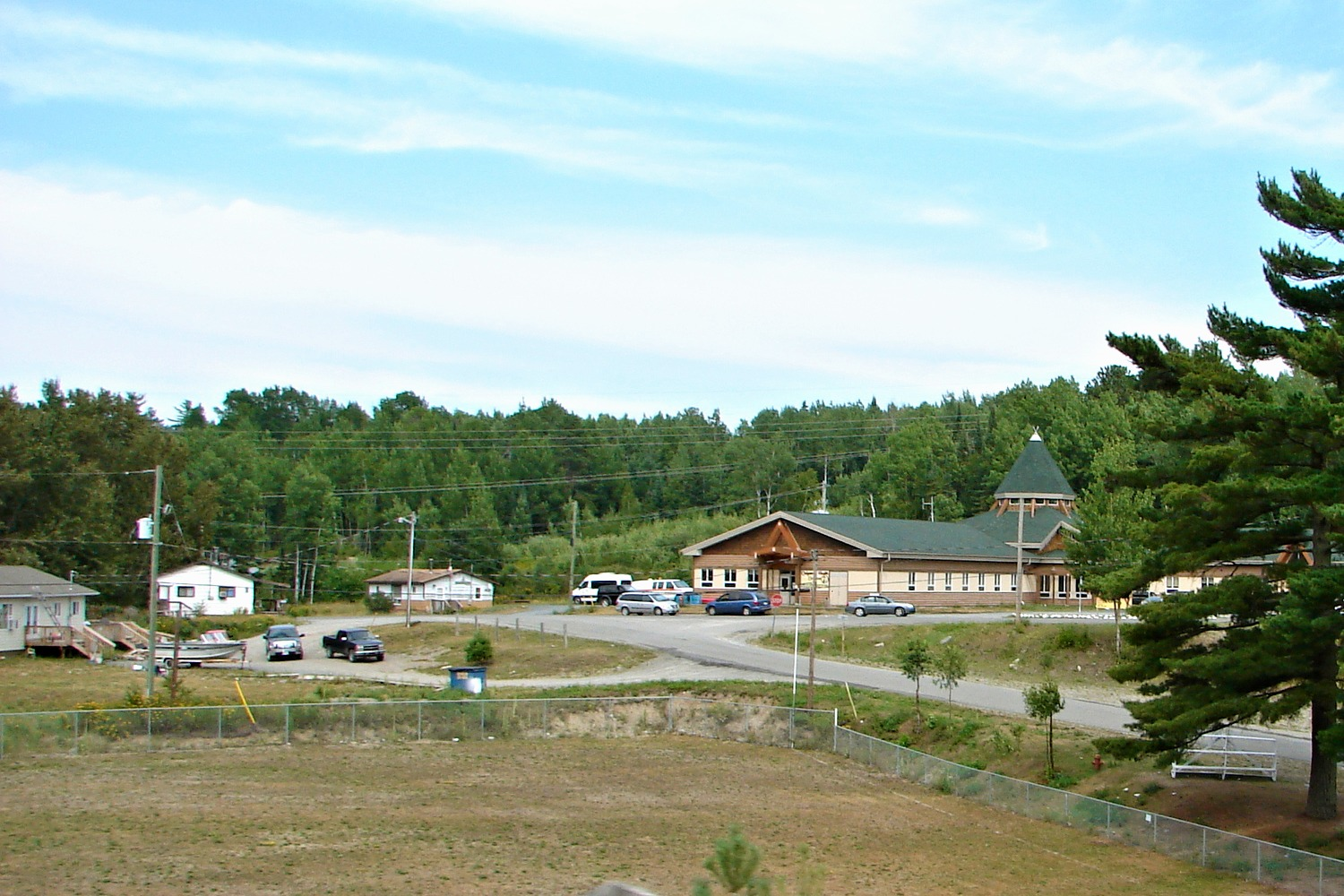

- Location within Ontario
- Coordinates: 49°11′N 93°55′W
- Country: Canada
- Province: Ontario
- District: Kenora
- First Nation: Ojibways of Onigaming

Area
  - Land: 5.00 km^{2} (1.93 sq mi)

Population (2011)
  - Total: 387
  - Density: 77.4/km^{2} (200/sq mi)

Sabaskong Bay 35D is a First Nations reserve on Kakagi Lake near Sioux Narrows-Nestor Falls, Ontario. It is the main reserve of the Ojibways of Onigaming First Nation.
