= Fort Frances–International Falls International Bridge =

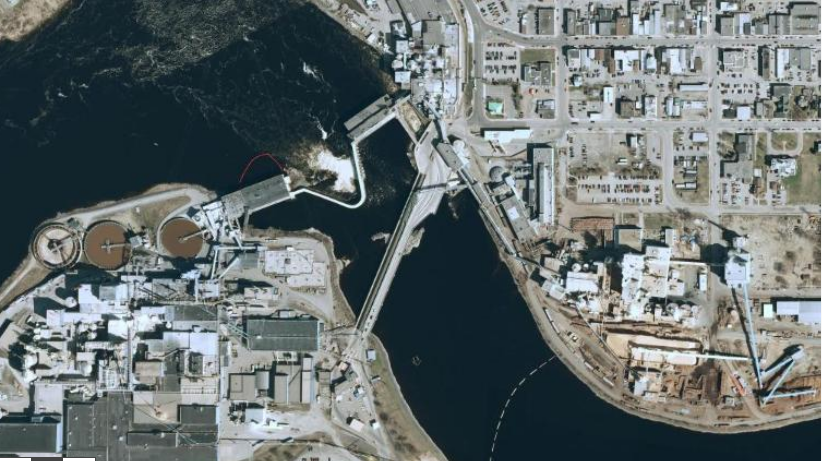
- Satellite view of the bridge, on the right. A power dam is on the left.
- Coordinates: 48°36′26″N 93°24′07″W
- Carries: US 53 / US 71 and Highway 71
- Crosses: Rainy River
- Locale: Fort Frances, Ontario
- Owner: Aazhogan
- Website: www.cbp.gov/contact/ports/international-falls

Characteristics
- Design: Parker Truss bridge and Half-through plate girder bridge (southbound); Concrete Girder bridge (northbound)
- Total length: 941 feet (287 m)
- Width: 12.5 feet (3.8 m)

History
- Opened: 1912 (1980 northbound couplet)

Statistics
- Toll: Cars/Pickups/Motorcycles $9 USD/$11 CAD Campers/Semi-Trucks/Busses $13 USD/$16 CAD Oversized Loads $350 USD/$430 CAD Additional axles $3 USD/$4 CAD each

Location
- Interactive map of Fort Frances–International Falls International Bridge

The Fort Frances–International Falls International Bridge is a privately owned international toll bridge connecting the towns of Fort Frances, Ontario, and International Falls, Minnesota, across the Rainy River.

The road and rail bridge was built in 1912 for the local Minnesota and Ontario Paper Company and as of 2023 is owned by Aazhogan Limited Partnership. Previous owners include Boise Inc. and Resolute Forest Products, which operated paper mills on the US and Canadian sides of the river, respectively, until the Fort Frances mill closed in 2014. A couplet for northbound vehicles was built in 1980.

The bridge toll is charged in US dollars on northbound traffic. As of early 2024, the toll rates are $9 USD/$11 CAD for cars, pickup trucks and motorcycles, $13 USD/$16 CAD for campers, semi-trucks and buses, and $350 USD/$430 CAD for oversized loads, with each additional axle being $3 USD/$4 CAD. Discounted multi-trip swipe cards are available at the area grocery stores. A commuter card, which provides 12 prepaid crossings, is available from local businesses for $72 USD/$90 CAD. There is no toll collected on southbound trips or for pedestrian traffic.

The bridge carries both road traffic and rail traffic of the Minnesota, Dakota and Western Railway without grade separation. The rails run along the west side of the bridge, which also carries a pipeline between the paper mills. The east side of the bridge carries two lanes of automobile traffic, one in each direction. Trucks and buses are directed to drive on the rail portion of the bridge, which is capable of handling heavier loads.

A dam constructed in 1905 lies immediately west of the bridge. The reservoir to the east of the dam conceals the rapids for which International Falls was named.

The bridge is the northern terminus of US Highway 71 (US 71) and US 53. It connects with Highway 11 and Highway 71, part of the Trans-Canada Highway, on the Ontario side.

== International crossing ==
The International Falls–Fort Frances Border Crossing connects the cities of International Falls, Minnesota and Fort Frances, Ontario, at the bridge. The US port of entry was established in 1895, when the city of International Falls and its post office were established. However, significant cross-border traffic didn't occur until after the dam across the Rainy River was completed in 1905. In 1912, the bridge was completed. It was built by the Minnesota and Ontario Paper Company, and featured a railroad track and two vehicular lanes. Cars and trucks must cross the tracks at grade on both ends of the bridge.

Customs checkpoints are located on both ends of the bridge for road traffic:

- United States Customs and Border Protection - 2 Second Ave, International Falls
- Canada Border Services Agency - 101 Church Street, Fort Frances

== Gallery ==
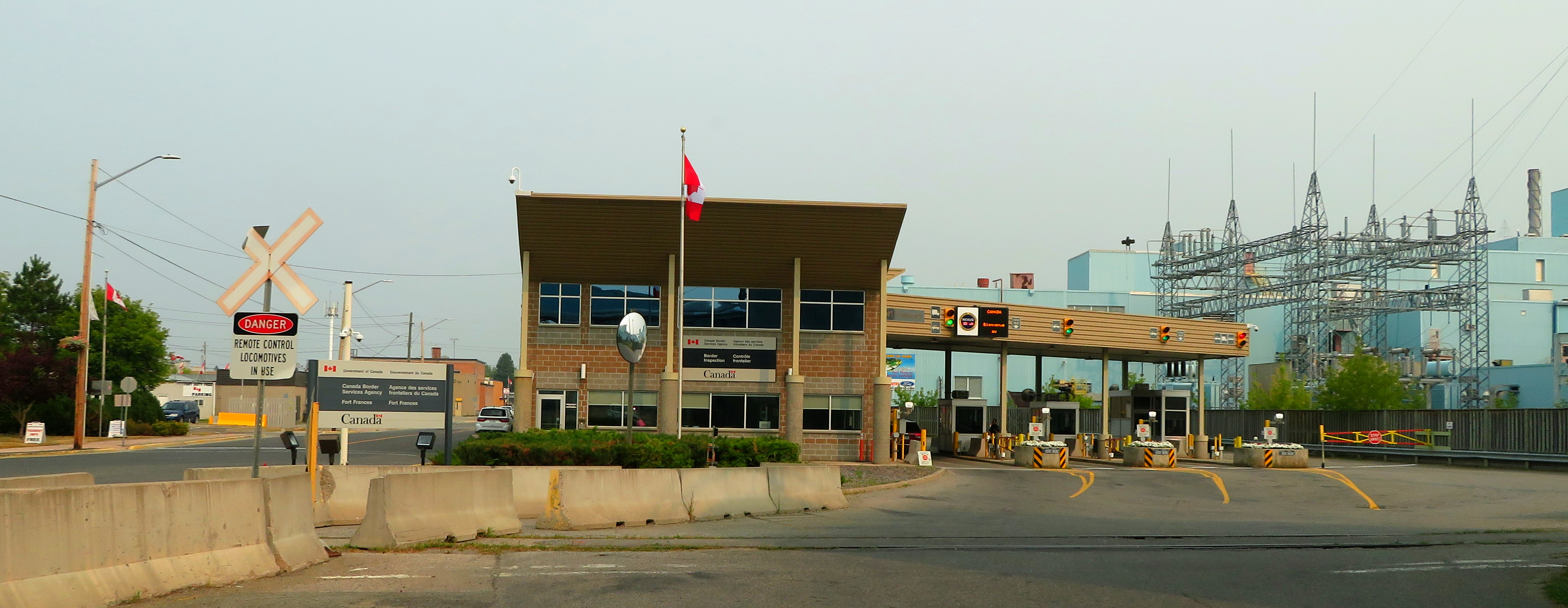
Border crossing into Fort Frances, Ontario

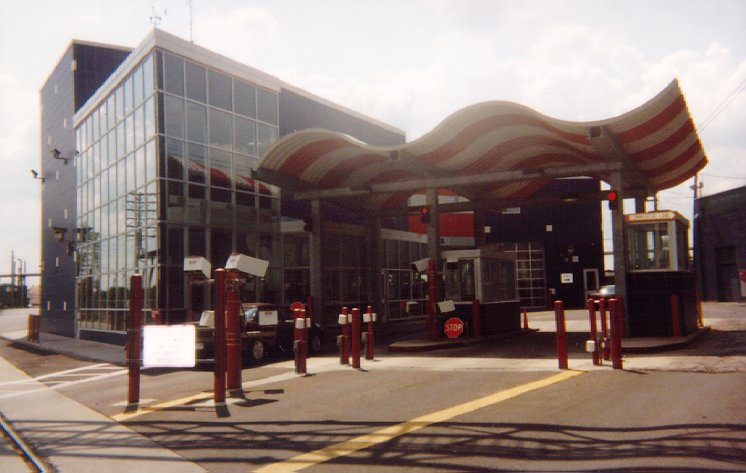
US Border Inspection Station at International Falls, MN as seen in 1998

== See also ==
- List of international bridges in North America
- List of Canada–United States border crossings
