= Eva Marion Lake =

Eva Marion Lake was a local services board in the Canadian province of Ontario, consisting of much of the portion of the Rainy River District lying east of Atikokan, including the communities of Sapawe and Kawene.

The area was counted as part of Rainy River, Unorganized, Ontario in Statistics Canada census data. Nearby places of interest included Quetico Provincial Park, Quetico Centre and Quetico North.

A 2008 memorandum by Ontario's Municipal Infrastructure Investment Initiative indicated that the local services board of Eva Marion Lake was in the process of dissolution. It was dissolved in July 2010 under the Northern Services Boards Act, 1990, with the Ministry of Northern Development, Mines and Forestry responsible for its assets, liabilities, and records.

== Sapawe ==
Sapawe is an Anishinini (Oji-cree) community located 30 kilometres east of Atikokan. Its name (from šāpāwē) means "running [water]" in Anishininiimowin.

Ontario's Crown forest is divided into geographic planning areas known as forest management units. Located around the community of Sapawe is the Sapawe Forest Management Unit.

== Kawene ==
Kawene (48°45′N 91°12′W) was formed due to the Canadian National rail line. It is located at the end of Highway 633, north of Highway 11. Lakes nearby include Eva Lake and Kawene Lake.
