= Sabaskong Bay 32C =

- Indian reserve
- Sabaskong Bay Indian Reserve No. 32C
- Location within Ontario
- Coordinates: 49°11′N 94°11′W
- Country: Canada
- Province: Ontario
- District: Rainy River
- First Nation: Naotkamegwanning

Area
  - Land: 5.18 km^{2} (2.00 sq mi)

Sabaskong Bay 32C is a First Nations reserve on Lake of the Woods in Ontario, Canada. It is one of the reserves of the Naotkamegwanning First Nation.
