= Eva Lake =

Lake in Alberta, Canada

- Location within Alberta
- Location: Alberta, Canada
- Coordinates: 58.919°N 115.183°W
- Type: lake

Eva Lake is a lake in Alberta, Canada.

Eva Lake was named after Eva Wallace, the wife of a surveyor.

== See also ==
- List of lakes of Alberta
