= Sioux Narrows Bridge =

- New Sioux Narrows Bridge opened in 2007.
- Coordinates: 49.413272°N 94.097954°W
- Carries: Highway 71/Trans-Canada Highway
- Crosses: Sioux Narrows (Lake of the Woods)
- Locale: Sioux Narrows, Ontario
- Maintained by: Ontario Ministry of Transportation
- ID number: 9340

Characteristics
- Design: Truss arch bridge, steel with wood cladding; formerly built entirely of wood.

History
- Opened: 1936 (original); November 12, 2007 (new)

Location
- Interactive map of Sioux Narrows Bridge

The Sioux Narrows Bridge is a bridge on Highway 71 at Sioux Narrows, Ontario, which spans the Sioux Narrows strait between Regina Bay and Whitefish Bay on Lake of the Woods.

It was initially built in 1936 as an all-wooden truss bridge made of Douglas fir timber treated with creosote, it was at 210 feet (64 m) the longest single-span wooden bridge in North America. The bridge overlooks the site of an 18th-century battle in which the local Anishnaabe and Cree nations defeated an invading force of Sioux. Due to its unique construction, the bridge was designated a heritage site under the Ontario Heritage Act.

It was rebuilt in the 1980s, but the wooden bridge proved inadequate due to wear and tear and it was replaced with a steel bridge in 2008. The new bridge was designed to resemble the old bridge.

== Reconstruction ==
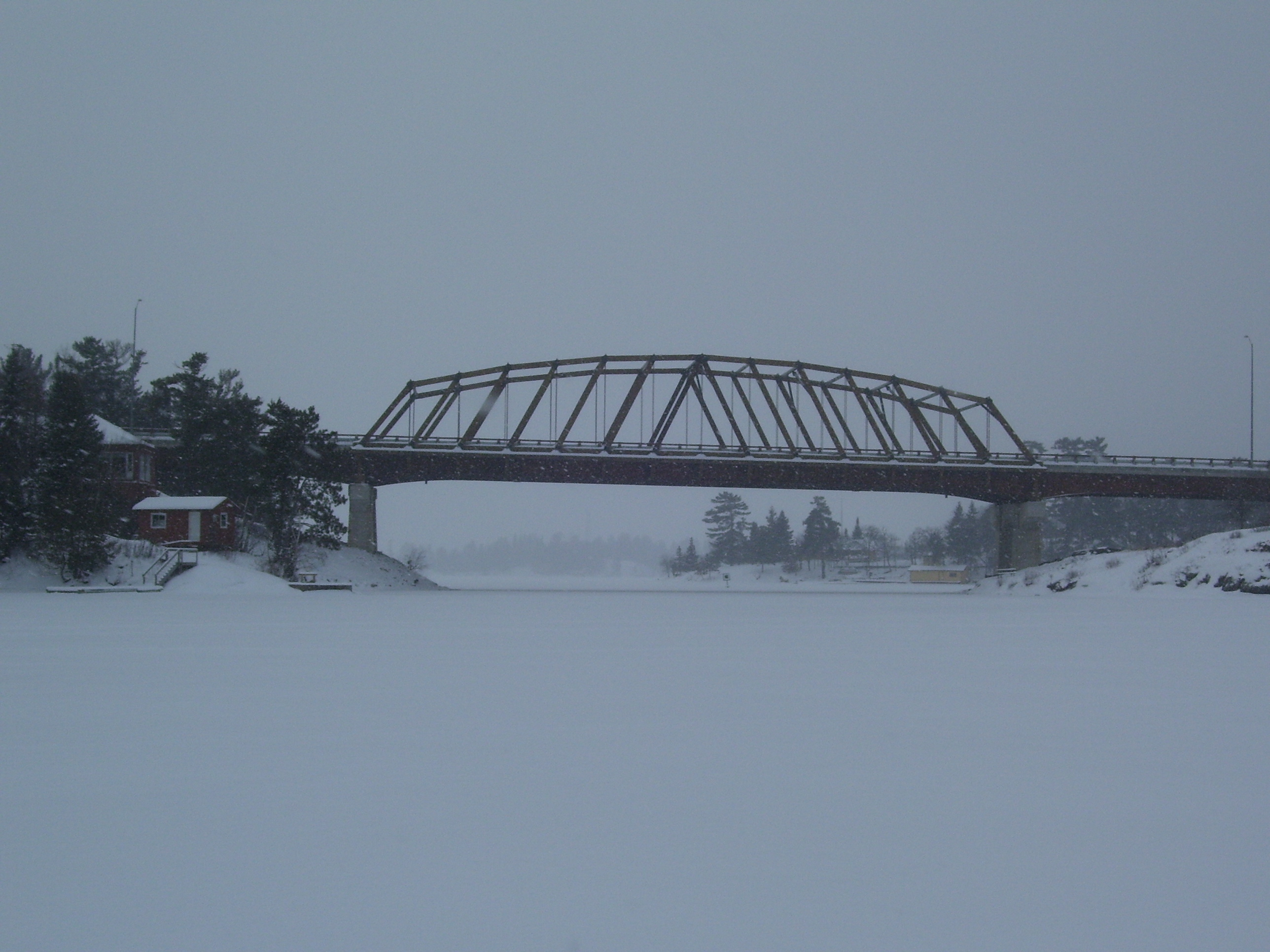
New Sioux Narrows Bridge in winter

In the early 1980s, study found that the load capacity of the trusses remained adequate, but there was significant overstress on the deck. In 1982, the bridge was reconstructed using a new prestressing technique, by which the deck planks were laid on their edges and squeezed together with hydraulic jacks to form a watertight slab, and then supported with steel reinforcing rods.

In the 1990s and early 2000s, the deteriorating quality of the structure necessitated load and lane restrictions on the bridge, with heavy trucking vehicles forced to detour via Ontario Highway 502 through Dryden or Ontario Highway 622 through Atikokan. Finally, a temporary bridge was built in 2003, and the wooden bridge was dismantled.

The decision was finally made to balance the need for structural improvements and durability with the structure's heritage by building the new bridge out of steel, but cladding the steel trusses in wood to preserve the original bridge's appearance.

Construction began on the new bridge in 2006, and the bridge was reopened to traffic in November 2007. The bridge was briefly closed on July 1, 2008, in order to stage its official opening ceremony. Bill Thompson, the mayor of the town at the time of the bridge's reopening, was the grandson of a construction worker who had worked on the original bridge. Some pieces of salvaged timber not used in recladding the new steel trusses were used to create artworks of the bridge for sale as a municipal fundraiser.

== See also ==
- List of bridges in Canada
