= Chapple, Ontario =

Chapple
- Township municipality (single-tier)
- Township of Chapple
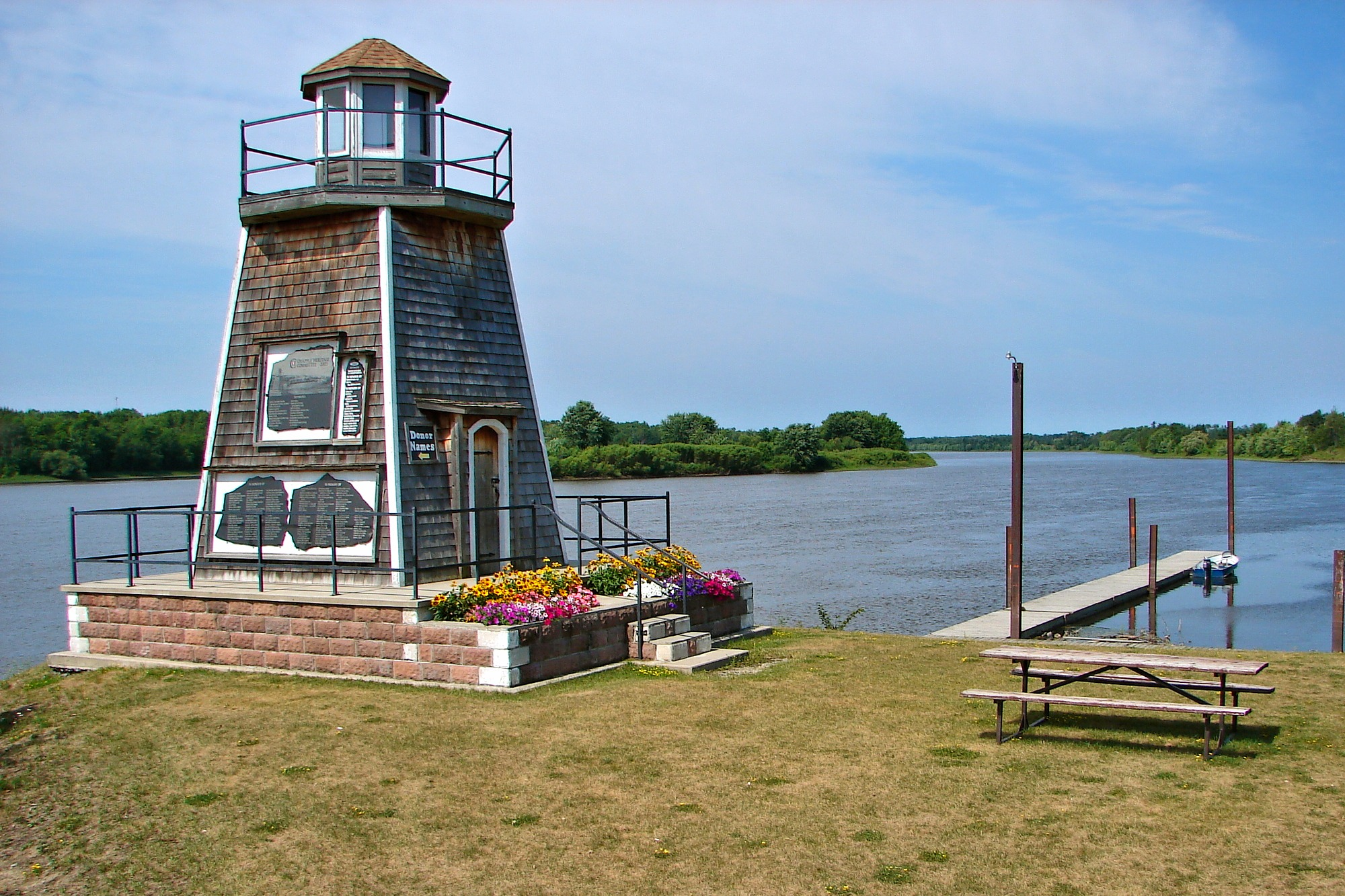
- The Rainy River in Barwick
- Etymology: Named after Thomas William Chapple
- Location in Ontario
- Coordinates: 48°44′33″N 93°59′41″W
- Country: Canada
- Province: Ontario
- District: Rainy River
- Incorporated: 1899

Government
  - Reeve: James Gibson
  - Fed. riding: Thunder Bay—Rainy River
  - Prov. riding: Kenora—Rainy River

Area
  - Land: 558.15 km^{2} (215.50 sq mi)
- Elevation: 335 m (1,099 ft)

Population (2021)
  - Total: 763
  - Density: 1.4/km^{2} (3.6/sq mi)
- Time zone: UTC-6 (Central Time Zone (CST))
  - Summer (DST): UTC-5 (Central Time Zone (CDT))
- Postal code: P0W 1A0
- Area code: 807
- Website: chapple.on.ca

Chapple is a township municipality in Rainy River District in Northwestern Ontario, Canada.

== Etymology ==
It was named after Thomas William Chapple, a former Ontario MPP from 1894 to 1898, who served as judge for the Rainy River District from 1898 to 1926. Before politics Chapple was a lawyer.

== Geography ==
=== Communities ===
Communities located in the township include:

- Barwick
- Black Hawk – near Barwick Road and Highway 600
- Finland – Highway 71 near Korpi/Lampi Road
- Manders – on Highway 11 at the west of the township
- Shenston – Fehr Road and Tait Road

The township is served by Ontario Highway 71, a branch of the Trans-Canada Highway, and by Highway 600.

=== Climate ===
Barwick has a humid continental climate (Köppen Dfb).

Climate data for Barwick (1981−2010 normals, extremes 1978–present)
Month	Jan	Feb	Mar	Apr	May	Jun	Jul	Aug	Sep	Oct	Nov	Dec	Year
Record high °C (°F)	9.0 (48.2)	14.0 (57.2)	19.5 (67.1)	31.0 (87.8)	34.0 (93.2)	36.5 (97.7)	35.5 (95.9)	36.0 (96.8)	34.0 (93.2)	30.0 (86.0)	21.0 (69.8)	9.0 (48.2)	36.5 (97.7)
Mean daily maximum °C (°F)	−9.5 (14.9)	−5.4 (22.3)	1.3 (34.3)	10.6 (51.1)	18.0 (64.4)	22.6 (72.7)	25.2 (77.4)	24.1 (75.4)	18.3 (64.9)	10.3 (50.5)	0.5 (32.9)	−7.0 (19.4)	9.1 (48.4)
Daily mean °C (°F)	−15.3 (4.5)	−11.6 (11.1)	−4.4 (24.1)	4.4 (39.9)	11.4 (52.5)	16.4 (61.5)	19.0 (66.2)	17.9 (64.2)	12.6 (54.7)	5.5 (41.9)	−3.4 (25.9)	−11.8 (10.8)	3.4 (38.1)
Mean daily minimum °C (°F)	−21.1 (−6.0)	−17.8 (0.0)	−10.1 (13.8)	−1.8 (28.8)	4.7 (40.5)	10.1 (50.2)	12.8 (55.0)	11.7 (53.1)	6.9 (44.4)	0.8 (33.4)	−7.3 (18.9)	−16.7 (1.9)	−2.3 (27.9)
Record low °C (°F)	−45.5 (−49.9)	−49.0 (−56.2)	−38.0 (−36.4)	−25.0 (−13.0)	−7.5 (18.5)	−2.0 (28.4)	2.5 (36.5)	−1.0 (30.2)	−5.5 (22.1)	−17.0 (1.4)	−39.0 (−38.2)	−44.0 (−47.2)	−49.0 (−56.2)
Average precipitation mm (inches)	29.8 (1.17)	21.3 (0.84)	29.8 (1.17)	39.2 (1.54)	76.2 (3.00)	124.7 (4.91)	102.9 (4.05)	78.8 (3.10)	76.2 (3.00)	58.8 (2.31)	41.8 (1.65)	30.7 (1.21)	710.2 (27.96)
Average rainfall mm (inches)	0.2 (0.01)	3.0 (0.12)	11.0 (0.43)	30.4 (1.20)	75.1 (2.96)	124.7 (4.91)	102.9 (4.05)	78.8 (3.10)	75.5 (2.97)	51.3 (2.02)	13.6 (0.54)	2.1 (0.08)	568.4 (22.38)
Average snowfall cm (inches)	29.5 (11.6)	18.3 (7.2)	18.8 (7.4)	8.9 (3.5)	1.1 (0.4)	0.0 (0.0)	0.0 (0.0)	0.0 (0.0)	0.8 (0.3)	7.5 (3.0)	28.3 (11.1)	28.6 (11.3)	141.8 (55.8)
Average precipitation days (≥ 0.2 mm)	13.7	10.7	11.3	9.4	12.5	13.4	12.2	11.4	12.9	12.7	12.4	14.8	147.5
Average rainy days (≥ 0.2 mm)	0.35	1.4	3.3	6.5	12.2	13.4	12.2	11.4	12.8	10.1	3.4	1.2	88.1
Average snowy days (≥ 0.2 cm)	13.5	10.0	9.0	3.7	0.81	0.0	0.0	0.0	0.31	3.7	10.0	14.2	65.2
Source: Environment Canada

== Demographics ==
In the 2021 Census of Population conducted by Statistics Canada, Chapple had a population of 763 living in 265 of its 332 total private dwellings, a change of 18.7% from its 2016 population of 643. With a land area of 558.15 km^{2} (215.50 sq mi), it had a population density of 1.4/km^{2} (3.5/sq mi) in 2021.

Canada census – Chapple community profile

	2021	2016	2011
Population	763 (+18.7% from 2016)	638 (-13.9% from 2011)	741 (-13.4% from 2006)
Land area	558.15 km^{2} (215.50 sq mi)	527.94 km^{2} (203.84 sq mi)	529.02 km^{2} (204.26 sq mi)
Population density	1.4/km^{2} (3.6/sq mi)	1.2/km^{2} (3.1/sq mi)	1.4/km^{2} (3.6/sq mi)
Median age	40.4 (M: 42.0, F: 39.6)	39.8 (M: 40, F: 39.4)	38.4 (M: 38, F: 38.8)
Private dwellings	332 (total) 265 (occupied)	225 (total)	376 (total)
Median household income	$79,500

References: 2021 2016 2011

Historical census populations – Chapple, Ontario

Year	Pop.	±%
1901	258	—
1911	974	+277.5%
1921	1,566	+60.8%
1931	1,666	+6.4%
1941	1,927	+15.7%
1951	1,716	−10.9%
1956	1,452	−15.4%

Year	Pop.	±%
1961	1,196	−17.6%
1966	1,101	−7.9%
1971	967	−12.2%
1976	990	+2.4%
1981	953	−3.7%
1986	933	−2.1%
1991	957	+2.6%

Year	Pop.	±%
1996	909	−5.0%
2001	910	+0.1%
2006	856	−5.9%
2011	741	−13.4%
2016	638	−13.9%
2021	763	+19.6%

Population counts are not adjusted for boundary changes.
Source: Statistics Canada

== Government ==
Township Council consists of a mayor and four councillors.

== Attractions ==
- Norlund Chapel – built from bell tower from St. Patrick's Church
- River View Park
- Pineview Conservative Mennonite Church
- Chapple Museum – formerly Gills Trading Post
- Chapple Lighthouse – built 2003
- Barwick Waterfront
- Saint Paul's Heritage Church – former Anglican Church

== See also ==
- List of townships in Ontario
