= Sioux Narrows-Nestor Falls =

- Township (single-tier)
- Township of Sioux Narrows-Nestor Falls
- Sioux Narrows Bridge

- Location within Ontario
- Coordinates: 49°24′N 94°05′W
- Country: Canada
- Province: Ontario
- District: Kenora
- Settled: 1880s
- Formed: January 1, 2001

Government
  - Mayor: Gale Black
  - Federal riding: Kenora—Kiiwetinoong
  - Prov. riding: Kenora—Rainy River

Area
  - Land: 1,215.80 km^{2} (469.42 sq mi)

Population (2021)
  - Total: 567
  - Density: 0.6/km^{2} (1.6/sq mi)
- Time zone: UTC-6 (CST)
  - Summer (DST): UTC-5 (CDT)
- Postal Code FSA: P0X
- Area code: 807
- Website: www.snnf.ca

Sioux Narrows-Nestor Falls is a township in the Canadian province of Ontario, located in the Kenora District. It is located on the eastern shores of Lake of the Woods along Ontario Highway 71.

The township was formed in 2001 by amalgamating the formerly incorporated Township of Sioux Narrows with portions of Unorganized Kenora District, including the community of Nestor Falls. The township had a population of 720 in the Canada 2011 Census.

== Communities ==
=== Sioux Narrows ===
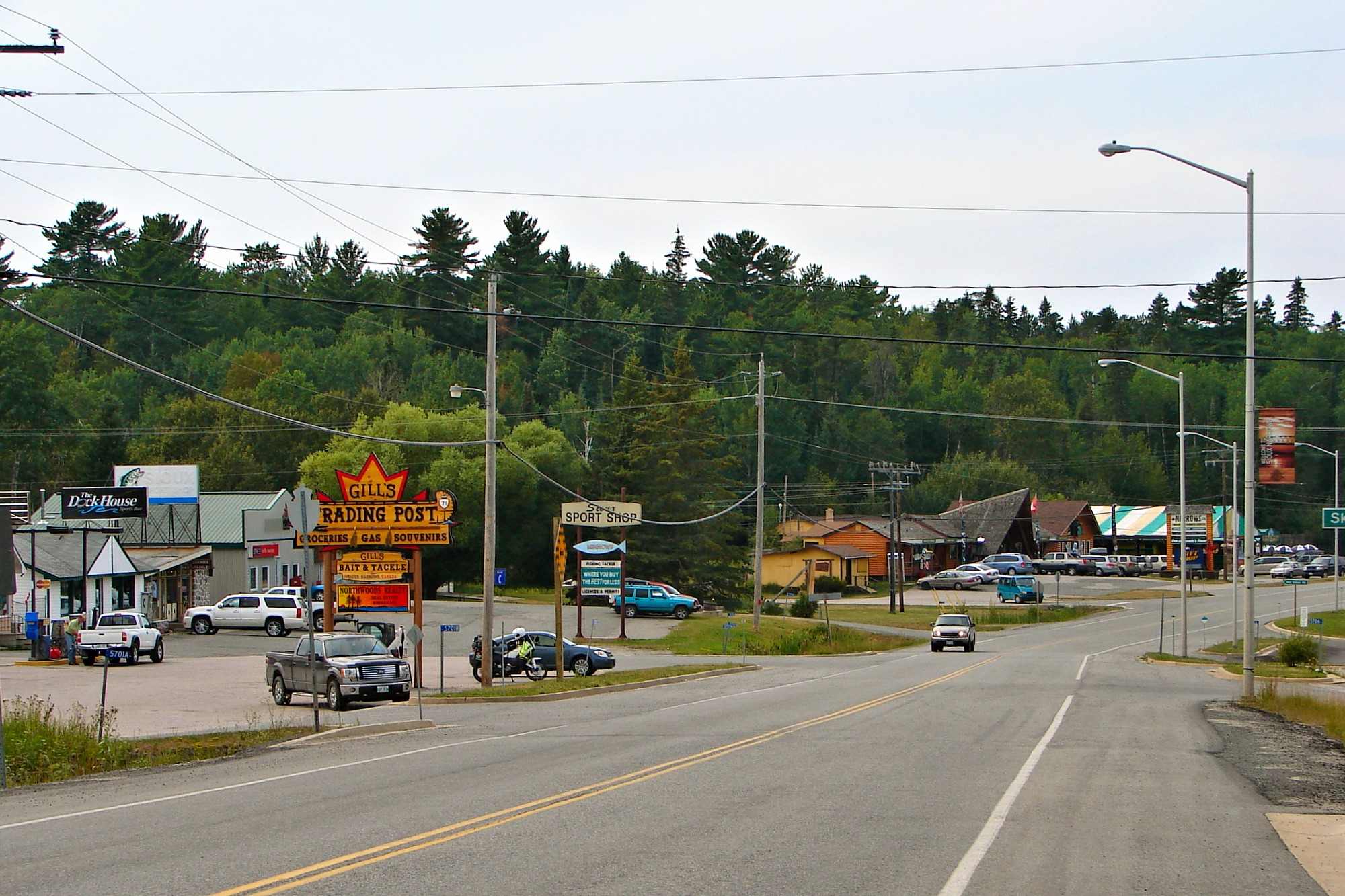
Town centre of Sioux Narrows

Sioux Narrows is a small resort community located on the shores of Lake of the Woods where Highway 71 crosses the eponymous narrows between Whitefish and Regina Bay. There are about 300 permanent residents, and about double that in the summer time when cottagers from Ontario, Manitoba, and the United States come for vacation. Tourism is the primary industry, with many resorts in the nearby vicinity.

In the mid-18th century, an Ojibwa-Cree alliance is said to have defeated an invading party of Sioux at a narrows here on the lake. Sioux Narrows is named in recognition of that event. The Sioux Narrows Bridge, a historic structure on Highway 71 which was reconstructed in 2007, overlooks the site of the battle.

=== Nestor Falls ===
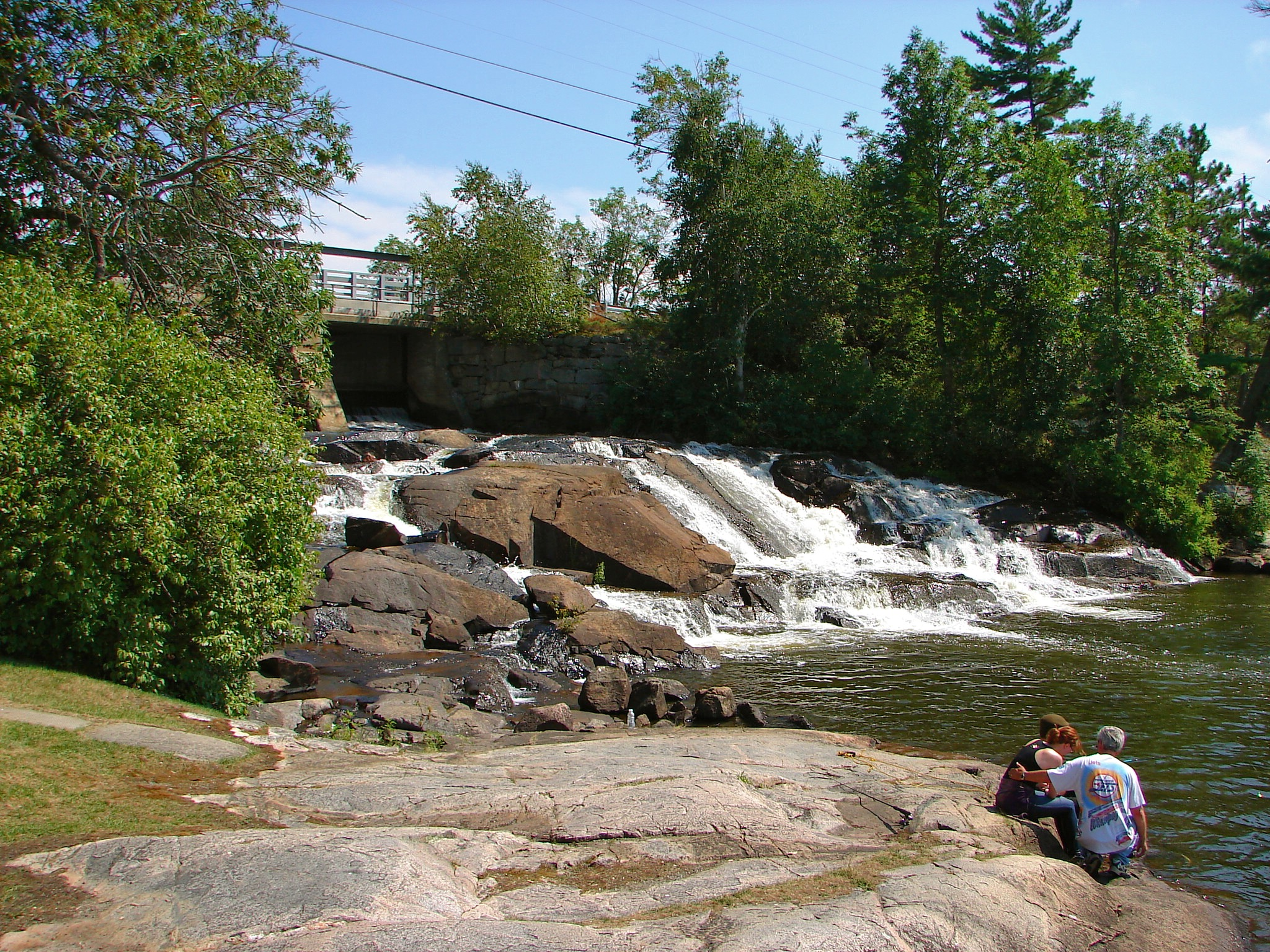
Nestor Falls

Nestor Falls, located along Highway 71 at Sabaskong Bay on Lake of the Woods, held the status of designated place in the Canada 2006 Census, and has a population of 290. The settlement was founded in the early 20th century by a certain Mr. Nestor who started logging operations and used the natural waterfall there to transport the logs to Lake of the Woods.

== History ==
The area was originally home to Ojibway and Cree indigenous people. In the 18th century, Lake of the Woods began to be exploited by European fur traders as a good source for fur and it became part of an established trade route from the Rainy River to Rat Portage. The main trading posts were set up at Rainy River and Fort Frances, but circa 1804, an outpost was also established on Whitefish Lake (now known as Regina Bay, directly east of Sioux Narrows) by the Northwest Company.

In the 1820s, the area was surveyed in order to determine the international border between the United States and British North America. But further development was limited since the Ojibway restricted European travelers only to the regular trade routes. In 1873, the Dominion of Canada signed Treaty 3, in which the Ojibway ceded vast tracts of territory to the Government of Canada. This permitted the first wave of settlers to arrive in the late 1870s or early 1880s. The construction of the Canadian Pacific Railway in 1881 further accelerated exploration, settlement, logging, and mining. The outpost on Whitefish Lake, since 1821 owned by the Hudson's Bay Company, was taken over by a private entrepreneur in the 1890s and operated until 1932.

In 1895, a gold mine opened on Regina Bay, employing about eighty-five men and led to the formation of a settlement with a schoolhouse, miner's residences and a community hall. The mine was fully operational only until 1900 and thereafter operated intermittently. During that period until 1935, settlement remained sporadic and isolated, heavily dependent on the cyclical presence of mining and logging camps, and only accessible by boat or winter roads. The construction of what is now known as Ontario Highway 71 in the 1930s resulted in permanent communities and opened the area to a booming outdoor tourism industry. In the late 1930s the Nestor Falls Post Office was merged with the Kakagi Lake Post Office and placed five miles south of Dalseg's store to accommodate commercial shipping trucks and buses travelling on the new highway.

== Demographics ==
In the 2021 Census of Population conducted by Statistics Canada, Sioux Narrows-Nestor Falls had a population of 727 living in 330 of its 1,061 total private dwellings, a change of 28.2% from its 2016 population of 567. With a land area of 1,215.8 km^{2} (469.4 sq mi), it had a population density of 0.6/km^{2} (1.5/sq mi) in 2021.

Canada census – Sioux Narrows-Nestor Falls community profile

| | 2021 | 2016 | 2011 |
| Population | 727 (+28.2% from 2016) | 567 (−21.3% from 2011) | 720 (7.1% from 2006) |
| Land area | 1,215.80 km^{2} (469.42 sq mi) | 1,223.12 km^{2} (472.25 sq mi) | 1,222.43 km^{2} (471.98 sq mi) |
| Population density | 0.6/km^{2} (1.6/sq mi) | 0.5/km^{2} (1.3/sq mi) | 0.6/km^{2} (1.6/sq mi) |
| Median age | 60.0 (M: 60.8, F: 59.6) | 57.7 (M: 58.4, F: 57.3) | 52.7 (M: 52.0, F: 53.5) |
| Private dwellings | 1,061 (total) 330 (occupied) | 797 (total) | 1044 (total) |
| Median household income | $77,500 | $70,400 |

References: 2021 2016 2011

Historical census populations – Sioux Narrows-Nestor Falls

| Year | Pop. | ±% |
|---|---|---|
| 2001 | 577 | — |
| 2006 | 672 | +16.5% |
| 2011 | 720 | +7.1% |

| Year | Pop. | ±% |
|---|---|---|
| 2016 | 567 | −21.3% |
| 2021 | 727 | +28.2% |

Source: Statistics Canada

Historical census populations – Sioux Narrows

| Year | Pop. | ±% |
|---|---|---|
| 1951 | 299 | — |
| 1956 | 467 | +56.2% |
| 1961 | 433 | −7.3% |
| 1966 | 504 | +16.4% |
| 1971 | 400 | −20.6% |

| Year | Pop. | ±% |
|---|---|---|
| 1976 | 412 | +3.0% |
| 1981 | 394 | −4.4% |
| 1986 | 373 | −5.3% |
| 1991 | 390 | +4.6% |

Source: Statistics Canada

== See also ==
- List of townships in Ontario
