= Nestor Falls, Ontario =

Unincorporated community in Ontario, Canada

Coordinates: 49.110352°N 93.926190°W

Nestor Falls is an unincorporated community in Ontario, Canada. It is recognized as a designated place by Statistics Canada.

== History ==
The community was founded in the early 20th century by a certain Mr. Nestor who started logging operations and used the natural waterfall there to transport the logs to Lake of the Woods.

== Demographics ==
In the 2021 Census of Population conducted by Statistics Canada, Nestor Falls had a population of 304 living in 130 of its 401 total private dwellings, a change of 25.6% from its 2016 population of 242. With a land area of 546.98 km^{2} (211.19 sq mi), it had a population density of 0.6/km^{2} (1.4/sq mi) in 2021.

Population of Nestor Falls
Name	Population (2021)	Population (2016)	Change	Land area (km^{2})	Population density
Nestor Falls part A	304	242	+25.6%	427.19	0.7/km^{2}
Nestor Falls part B	0	0	NA	47.98	0.0/km^{2}
Nestor Falls part C	0	0	NA	71.81	0.0/km^{2}
Total	304	242	+25.6%	546.98	0.6/km^{2}

== See also ==
- List of communities in Ontario
- List of designated places in Ontario
