= La Vallee, Ontario =

La Vallee
- Township (single-tier)
- Township of La Vallee
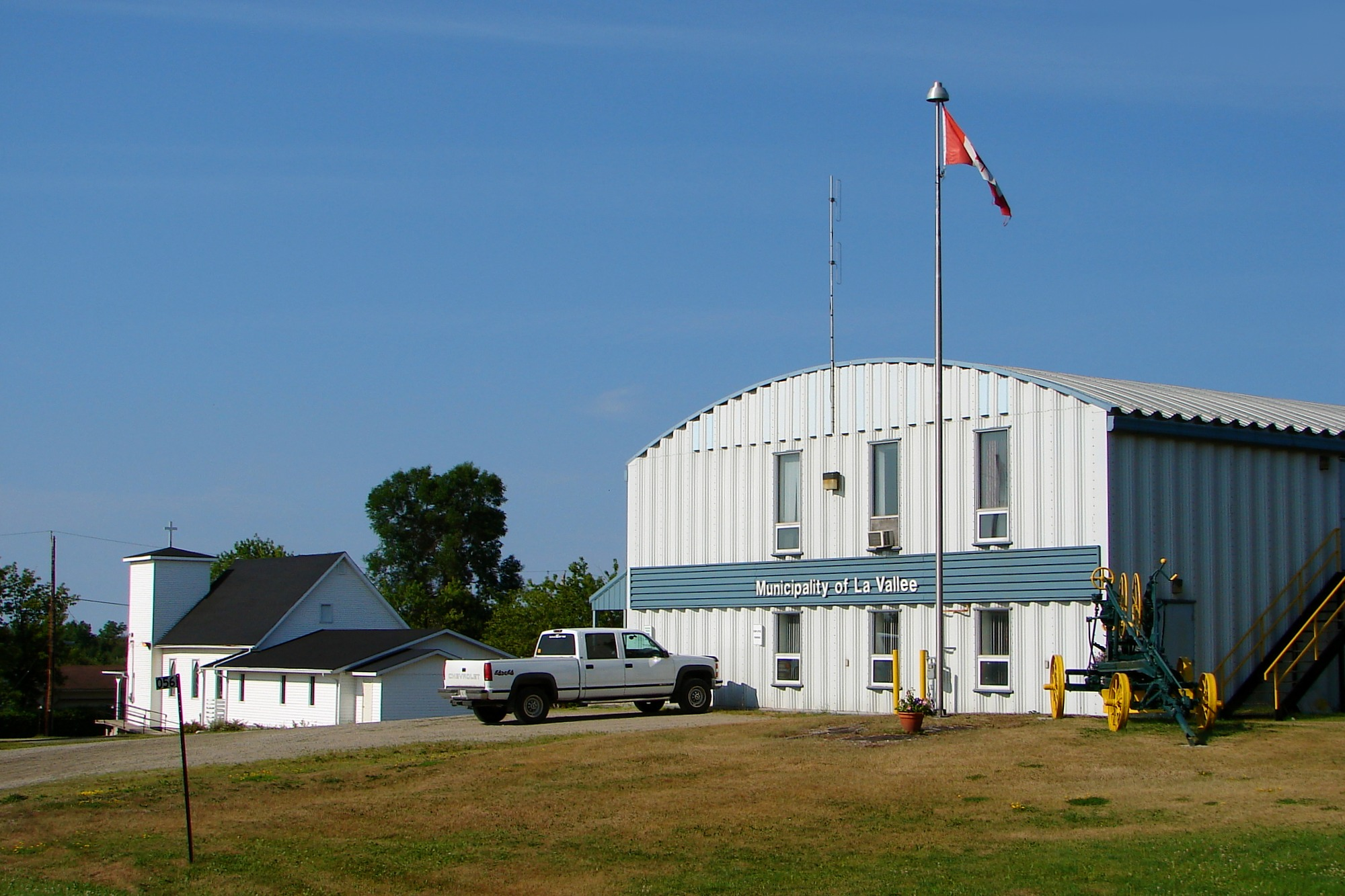
- Municipal office in Devlin

- Location within Ontario
- Coordinates: 48°37′N 93°39′W
- Country: Canada
- Province: Ontario
- District: Rainy River

Government
  - Reeve: Lucille MacDonald
  - Fed. riding: Thunder Bay—Rainy River
  - Prov. riding: Kenora—Rainy River

Area
  - Land: 237.12 km^{2} (91.55 sq mi)

Population (2021)
  - Total: 788
  - Density: 3.3/km^{2} (8.5/sq mi)
- Time zone: UTC-6 (CST)
  - Summer (DST): UTC-5 (CDT)
- Postal Code: P0W 1C0
- Area code: 807
- Website: lavallee.ca

La Vallee is a township in the Canadian province of Ontario, located within the Rainy River District.

== Geography ==
La Vallee Township stretches for 9.7 kilometres (6 mi) along the north side of the Rainy River, with a depth of 15 miles (24 km), and consists of the geographic townships of Devlin, Burriss and Woodyatt.

The township includes the communities of:

- Big Fork (48°31′18″N 93°40′20″W)
- Box Alder (48°33′44″N 93°40′26″W)
- Burriss (48°40′43″N 93°40′20″W)
- Devlin (48°37′07″N 93°40′19″W)
- Lake Wasaw (48°43′19″N 93°38′53″W)
- La Vallee (48°36′55″N 93°37′47″W)

== Demographics ==
In the 2021 Census of Population conducted by Statistics Canada, La Vallee had a population of 788 living in 319 of its 379 total private dwellings, a change of −16% from its 2016 population of 938. With a land area of 237.12 km^{2} (91.55 sq mi), it had a population density of 3.3/km^{2} (8.6/sq mi) in 2021. The township's population of 938 in 2016 was down 5.1% from 2011.

Canada census – La Vallee community profile

| | 2021 | 2016 | 2011 |
| Population | 788 (-16.0% from 2016) | 938 (-5.1% from 2011) | 988 (-7.4% from 2006) |
| Land area | 237.12 km^{2} (91.55 sq mi) | 237.84 km^{2} (91.83 sq mi) | 237.50 km^{2} (91.70 sq mi) |
| Population density | 3.3/km^{2} (8.5/sq mi) | 3.9/km^{2} (10/sq mi) | 4.2/km^{2} (11/sq mi) |
| Median age | 44.8 (M: 44.0, F: 45.2) | 43.6 (M: 43.7, F: 43.1) | 40.9 (M: 40.4, F: 41.4) |
| Private dwellings | 379 (total) 319 (occupied) | 395 (total) | 383 (total) |
| Median household income | $99,000 | $82,176 |

References: 2021 2016 2011

Historical census populations – La Vallee Township

| Year | Pop. | ±% |
|---|---|---|
| 1901 | 591 | — |
| 1911 | 728 | +23.2% |
| 1921 | 904 | +24.2% |
| 1931 | 993 | +9.8% |
| 1941 | 1,039 | +4.6% |
| 1951 | 888 | −14.5% |
| 1956 | 882 | −0.7% |

| Year | Pop. | ±% |
|---|---|---|
| 1961 | 950 | +7.7% |
| 1966 | 924 | −2.7% |
| 1971 | 924 | +0.0% |
| 1976 | 933 | +1.0% |
| 1981 | 977 | +4.7% |
| 1986 | 1,034 | +5.8% |
| 1991 | 1,081 | +4.5% |

| Year | Pop. | ±% |
|---|---|---|
| 1996 | 1,130 | +4.5% |
| 2001 | 1,073 | −5.0% |
| 2006 | 1,067 | −0.6% |
| 2011 | 988 | −7.4% |
| 2016 | 938 | −5.1% |
| 2021 | 788 | −16.0% |

Source: Statistics Canada

== See also ==
- List of townships in Ontario
