= Pollution in Canada =

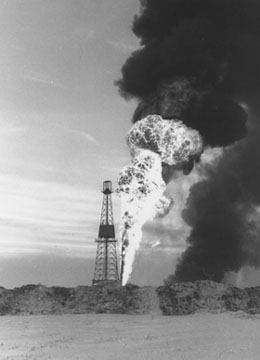
Leduc oil

Pollution in Canada refers to the introduction of contaminants into the natural environment, including air, water, and soil systems. It is recognized in scientific literature and government policy as a significant environmental and public health issue, and associated with industrial activity, transportation emissions, agricultural runoff, resource extraction (notably mining, oil and gas development), and urban development.

Air pollution
primarily associated with greenhouse gas emissions, particulate matter, nitrogen oxides, and ground-level ozone, largely produced by transportation, industry, and energy production. While air quality has improved in many regions due to regulatory measures, certain urban and industrial areas continue to experience elevated pollution levels, with documented associations to respiratory and cardiovascular health effects.

Water pollution
historically been linked to industrial waste, agricultural runoff, inadequate wastewater treatment in some regions, and contamination of freshwater ecosystems. Although Canada has extensive freshwater resources and regulatory frameworks intended to protect water quality, localized issues persist, including nutrient loading, toxic waste, and advisories affecting drinking water in some Indigenous and rural communities.

Soil contamination
occurs in areas affected by industrial activity, waste disposal, mining, and the use of agricultural chemicals. Remediation efforts are ongoing at contaminated sites across the country, particularly in former industrial zones and resource extraction regions.

Pollution contributes to broader policy debates on economic development, resource extraction, and environmental protection, with public concern linked to its health impacts, environmental degradation, and effects on biodiversity. Environmental policy in Canada also increasingly incorporates climate change mitigation and sustainable development goals, while regulation is addressed through a combination of federal legislation, such as the Canadian Environmental Protection Act, provincial environmental regulations, and municipal bylaws.

== Air pollution ==
Air pollution in Canada is caused by industrial and vehicle emissions, agriculture, construction, wood burning, and energy production. Ongoing monitoring of Canada's Air Pollutant Emissions Inventory shows that 14 of the 17 of the air pollutants monitored are decreasing compared to historical levels. Data of 2019 shows that Canada is expected to meet or exceed its emission reduction commitments for 2020, as per the amended Gothenburg Protocol.

=== Oil sands pollution ===
Oil sands, Fort McMurray, Alberta

While overall pollution levels have dropped, it was found that oil sand pollution has increased by 20% since 2009. Tar sands facilities were found to be among the top four highest polluters of volatile organic compounds (VOCs)- a major air contaminant. VOCs and other air contaminants are set to increase in the future as a result of continued output from the oil sands. Oil sand pollution is not only set to increase VOCs, but also, acid rain. Acid rain is rain that has been contaminated by airborne chemicals, making it acidic. Two major causes of acid rain are sulphur dioxide and nitrogen oxide. Acid rain can cause damage to soil, water, wildlife, plants and buildings. Additionally, the airborne particles that cause acid rain can also contribute to smog. In recent years progress has been made in reducing acid rain, however, Alberta's oil sands may soon set back this progress.

=== Pollution from oil wells ===
In southeastern Saskatchewan, air pollution from oil production has breached provincial air quality standards hundreds of times since 2014.

=== Canada/United States transboundary pollution ===
In recent years, the Canada-United States Air Quality Agreement, signed on 13 March 1992, has improved air quality by reducing sulfur dioxide and nitrogen oxide emissions in both countries. The agreement was meant to address the issue of transnational air pollution between the two countries. The agreement was expanded in 2000 to also include goals of reducing emissions of volatile organic compounds and levels of ground-level ozone. Ground-level ozone is caused by reactions between nitrogen oxides and VOCs in the presence of sunlight. Ozone is a contributor to smog and is known to cause numerous respiratory diseases. The 2012 Canada-United States Air Quality Agreement Progress Report found that "Canada's total emissions of sulfur dioxide have decreased by 57% from 1990 levels while the U.S. has reduced total sulfur dioxide emissions from covered sources by 67% from their 1990 emission levels. Between 2000 and 2010, Canada reduced total emissions of nitrogen oxides by 40% in the transboundary ozone region while U.S. total nitrogen oxide emissions decreased by 42% in the region".

While transnational pollution between the United States and Canada has decreased many Canadians still say they contend with polluted air as a result of drifting pollution from the U.S. Approximately 70% of the air pollution in Canada comes from the United States. In 2006 the government of Ontario announced that "5,000 premature deaths caused by smog in the province every year can be attributed to air pollution that crosses the Canada-U.S. border." Additionally, the then (2006) mayor of Halifax, Peter Kelley, also proclaimed "over 50 per cent of air pollutants over New Brunswick and Nova Scotia are from the U.S. For us, we're trying to deal with what's coming our way, but also what we generate here as well." In an attempt to combat the pollution a petition was created. In 2006 the petition was filed by thirteen Canadian municipalities to the U.S. Environmental Protection Agency calling for a reduction in coal-fired plants.

=== Climate Change Accountability Act ===
The Climate Change Accountability Act called for greenhouse gas emissions to be 25% below 1990 levels by 2021, and 80% below 1990 levels by 2050. Although the bill was passed by the House of Commons, the bill was defeated by the Senate. Environment Minister Jim Prentice stated in early 2010 that the new goal for greenhouse gas emissions would be 17% below 2005 levels by 2020, the equivalent of a 3% increase from 1990.

== Water pollution ==
While most of Canada's surface and ground water is generally clean there is some local and regional water pollution that can be caused by "industrial and municipal discharge, runoff, spills, and deposition of airborne pollutants". Contaminated water can result in a myriad of serious consequences for human health.

=== Oil sands pollution ===
As previously stated, Alberta's oil sands are set to cause growing levels of acid rain consequentially leading to an increase in water contamination in the area. Acid rain will cause Canada's lakes and rivers to become further acidified. This is a problem as it decreases levels of surface water calcium. This lower concentration of calcium is already having particularly adverse effects on plant life, as can be seen with the Daphnia species-an important food source for aquatic species and marine life.

A recent study at the University of Alberta found levels of metals like arsenic, lead and mercury to be considerably higher than national guidelines in water downstream from Albertan oil sites. This pollution could potentially result in harmful health implications for fish and other wildlife. The study further discerned that their findings were "contrary to claims made by industry and government" who purported that "pollutants are from natural sources and not from the expanding production of oil from tar sands."

Other than contributing to acid rain and high levels of metals in water, sites of oil production can also cause significant damage by human error and runoff. A prominent example is the 2007 case involving the Athabasca River. Due to human error, energy magnate Suncor spilled 9.8 million liters of oil sands waste water into the river causing adverse effects for people and wildlife in the area. The Athabasca River can also be used as an example of oil sands runoff. It was found that the Athabasca's waters, which are downstream from the oil sands, had higher concentrations of pollutants as a result of runoff. High concentrations of pollutants can have serious consequences for wildlife and humans. Recently, it was reported that there were significant increases in fish deformities as well as an increase in cancer rates in a Native community downstream from the Athabasca.

=== Great Lakes pollution ===
Pollution of the Great Lakes, the world's biggest bodies of fresh water, continue to be a significant problem for both Canada and the United States. According to Derek Stack, executive director of Great Lakes United, "High pollution levels in the Great Lakes basin continue to take an apparent toll on the air and water quality of the ecosystem." In 2002, it was reported that the Great Lakes basin was home to 45% of all toxic air pollution in Canada, in turn affecting the Great Lakes' water. An even more recent report suggests that the Alberta oil sands' impact could reach as far as the Great Lakes. The report warns that "[oil] refineries will be using the Great Lakes 'as a cheap supply' source for their copious water needs and the area’s air 'as a pollution dump'."

Sulphur dioxide emissions have also contributed to the acidity in Canada's Lakes. The thousands of lakes in Canada (including the Great Lakes) have an average pH of 5, which is harmfully acidic for aquatic life in these lakes.

In September 2012, the United States and Canada signed an amended version of the Great Lakes Water Quality Agreement. The overarching purpose of the Agreement is to "restore and maintain the chemical, physical and biological integrity of the waters". Significant amendments made to the Agreement include "address[ing] aquatic invasive species, habitat degradation and the effects of climate change, and support continued work on existing threats to people's health and the environment in the Great Lakes Basin such as harmful algae, toxic chemicals, and discharges from other vessels". However, some people contend that the changes made to the Agreement while good in principle, lack the "hard number goals, and actions to reach them."

=== Arctic waters pollution ===
Under the 1970 Arctic Waters Pollution Prevention Act, the Canadian government established a document to prevent pollution of Canadian Arctic waters. However, in recent years Arctic waters have become increasingly polluted. It was recently found that due to pollution some waters have levels of lead that are higher than the Canadian guidelines.

Coastal communities that emit waste also contribute to arctic pollution. Arctic coastal communities do not presently have the infrastructure necessary to properly deal with their waste, this could lead to greater pollution in the future as these communities continue to grow in size. Other than coastal communities, waste and litter from the rest of the world continues to be a significant issue in the Arctic, with waste levels doubling in the past ten years. The most significant types of litter found are plastic items and plastic bags.

=== Pollution from sewage ===
The Guidelines for Canadian Drinking Water Quality are guidelines for drinking water quality standards in Canada developed by Health Canada. These guidelines set forth recommendations for the maximum concentrations of various substances in drinking water. Provinces and territories are responsible for enforcing these guidelines, as there is no national regulatory body for drinking water. Water pollution by sewage is one of the main culprits involved in polluting drinking water. Advocacy group Ecojustice estimates overall raw sewage dumping in Canada to be around 200 billion litres a year. The Canadian government recently announced waste water regulations that would allow for sewage to be dumped into Canadian waters until 2040. Proper measures for waste water disposal will not immediately be put in place, rather, they will be implemented gradually from 2020 to 2040. However, in the meantime, Canadian municipalities may continue to pollute their waters by dumping sewage. This can prominently be viewed with Halifax, Nova Scotia. In Halifax, human waste is dumped directly into the Halifax harbour. This dumping can mainly be attributed to a failure in their sewage treatment infrastructure. Victoria, British Columbia also follows a similar practice by getting rid of their untreated waste into the ocean. However, the government has plans to open operational treatment facilities for 2016.

Water pollution resulting from sewage can also be attributed to error in sewage facilities. A recent example can be evidenced with Ottawa. In 2004 Ottawa experienced a 190 million liter raw sewage spill into the Ottawa River. Similarly, Winnipeg, released "partially treated sewage water into the Red River for seven weeks" in 2011. However, in this case, the city was actually charged for their pollution. Numerous other places like Richmond B.C and Calgary A.B, have experienced significant sewage spills in their native waters.

== Soil contamination ==
While soil pollution is present in Canada, it is not yet an area of great national concern. Some of the main causes of soil pollution include chemical/oil spills into the ground, road salt, excessive pesticide use by farmers, acid rain, and polluted water.

=== Soil degradation/pollution ===
Acid Deposition is a leading cause of soil degradation. The acidic particles from pollutants become part of soil, harming the pH with such low acidity and therefore harming the organisms that live within the soil. As Environment Canada mentions "soil degradation degrades the land and places significant stress on ecologically sensitive biota and flora". Soil degradation in Canada's biologically sensitive forests as a result of pollution, is one of the most significant cases of degradation in the country. One study found that 12% of Alberta's forests' soils are over their acid carrying capacity. This rise in acidity is attributed to the continual extraction of fossil fuel from the Alberta oil sands. Oil refinery sites, like those found in Alberta, have become some of the most dominant contributors to Canadian soil pollution. A further example can be witnessed in Calgary, where a neighbourhood built on an old Imperial Oil refinery needed their soil replaced due to contamination.

=== Road salt pollution ===
As a result of Canada's icy winters, road salt is needed in order to deice slippery roads. The primary ingredient of road salt is sodium chloride. Road salt, while helping cars and people to gain traction in the winter, can have serious consequences for soil. As National Geographic found, "Road salt can pollute soil at every stage in the deicing process." This pollution is a result of numerous factors such as runoff, application and spray from vehicles. In Canada, there has been research that shows that "salt run-off from roads can increase local chloride levels to between 100 and 4,000 times normal levels." Salt can have adverse effects on soil and soil composition. Significant levels of chloride (one of the main components in salt) can "alter the soil 's pH chemistry and elevate levels of heavy metal pollutants, while at the same time causing a loss of soil structure and killing off micro-organisms". These effects can have dire consequences for plants rendering them unable to grow or stunting their growth.

=== PCB pollution ===
Salt and oil refineries are not the only contaminants of soil. Polychlorinated biphenyls or PCBs also pollute the soil. PCBs are released into the environment through "spills, leaks from electrical and other equipment, and improper disposal and storage". However, recently it was found that household weeds were able to remove PCBs from contaminated soil. A study found that "the weeds stored PCBs in their shoots and could be harvested for disposal cutting the need to expensively remove and incinerate contaminated soil".

== Plastic pollution ==
The Canadian federal government formed a current institution that protects marine areas; this includes the mitigation of plastic pollution. In 1997, Canada adopted legislation for oceans management and passed the Oceans Act. Federal governance, Regional Governance, and Aboriginal Peoples are the actors involved in the process of decision-making and implementation of the decision. The Regional Governance bodies are federal, provincial, and territorial government agencies that hold responsibilities of the marine environment. Aboriginal Peoples in Canada have treaty and non-treaty rights related to ocean activities. According to the Canadian government, they respect these rights and work with Aboriginal groups in oceans management activities.

With the Oceans Act made legal, Canada made a commitment to conserve and protect the oceans. The Oceans Act underlying principle is sustainable development, precautionary and integrated management approach to ensure that there is a comprehensive understanding in protecting marine areas. In the integrated management approach, the Oceans Act designates federal responsibility to the Minister of Fisheries and Oceans Canada for any new and emerging ocean-related activities. The Act encourages collaboration and coordination within the government that unifies interested parties. Moreover, the Oceans Act engages any Canadians who are interested in being informed of the decision-making regarding ocean environment.

In 2005, federal organizations developed the Federal Marine Protected Areas Strategy. This strategy is a collaborative approach implemented by Fisheries and Oceans Canada, Parks Canada, and Environment Canada to plan and manage federal marine protected areas. The federal marine protected areas work with Aboriginal groups, industries, academia, environmental groups, and NGOs to strengthen marine protected areas. The federal marine protected areas network consists of three core programs: Marine Protected Areas protected under the Oceans Act, marine National Wildlife Areas protected under the Canada Wildlife Act, and National Marine Conservation Areas protected under the Canada National Marine Conservation Areas Act.

In 2021, the government of Canada officially added plastic manufactured items to a list of toxic substances under the Canadian Environmental Protection Act, 1999. Later in 2021, the government moved forward on regulations to ban single-use plastics, namely checkout bags, cutlery, foodservice ware made from or containing problematic plastics, ring carrier, stir sticks and most straws.

== Health effects of pollution ==
Pollution is associated with numerous negative health effects in humans.

=== Air pollution ===
Air pollution has been shown to negatively effect humans' cardiovascular and respiratory systems. Lung tissue can be damaged with direct exposure to air pollutants such as ozone, potentially causing lung inflammation and impairment of lung function. As Environment Canada mentions "impacts from exposure can range from "minor breathing problems to premature death". Some of the main respiratory diseases caused by air pollution include asthma, chronic obstructive pulmonary disease, and lung cancer. Specific cardiovascular disease and problems caused by air pollution include heart attack, hypertension, inflammation around the heart, stroke and arrhythmias.

Health Canada estimates that 5,900 Canadians die every year from air pollution. A 2008 study by the Canadian Medical Association estimated that almost 3,000 Canadians die annually from short-term exposure to air pollution, while another 18,000 die annually due to long-term effects of polluted air. The study estimated the economic impact of air pollution to be at $8 billion, including lost productivity, health care costs, deaths and a decrease in quality of life.

=== Soil pollution ===
Soil pollution also causes numerous diseases. Some of the most prominent are cancer, kidney disease, liver disease, dysentery, skin infections, and stomach infections.

In the Federal Contaminated Sites Action Plan Phase III soil pollution is classified as:

Petroleum hydrocarbons
from fuel storage, underground tanks, spills and historical fuel-handling operations.
Heavy metals and other inorganic contaminants
particularly mercury, lead and other metals, often associated with industrial, military and operational activities.
Polycyclic aromatic hydrocarbons
associated with petroleum products, combustion and historical industrial activity.
Volatile organic compounds
compounds such as benzene, toluene, ethylbenzene and xylenes (BTEX), commonly associated with fuels and solvents.
PolyChlorinated Biphenyls
persistent industrial chemicals historically used in electrical equipment.
Pesticides and wood-treatment chemicals
including substances such as pentachlorophenol.
Dioxins and furans
persistent contaminants associated with certain historical industrial processes and combustion.

== See also ==
- Indoor air quality
- Hard Choices: Climate Change in Canada
- Mercury pollution in Canada
- Paper and pulp industry in Dryden, Ontario#Environmental issues
- Tar sand § Environmental issues
