= Environment of Canada =

The environment is the subject of ministries at the federal and provincial level in Canada, with the current highest environmental government official being the national Minister of the Environment Steven Guilbeault. Canada's large landmass and coastline make it very susceptible to any climate changes, so any contemporary changes of climate in the country are of national concern. Of the factors caused by human intervention that can affect this environment, activities that sustain the economy of Canada such as oil and gas extraction, mining, forestry and fishing are influential. The increase in greenhouse gas emissions in Canada between 1990 and 2015 was mainly due to larger emissions from mining, oil, and gas extraction and transport. In 2011 United Nations said Canada's environment was the best in the world.

Several governmental programs have been created to mitigate 20th and 21st century climate change, such as the One-Tonne Challenge. In late 2005 Canada hosted the United Nations Climate Change Conference in Montreal, Quebec. Hundreds of environmental organizations have been founded in Canada.

== Environmental political power ==
On October 21, 2019 Canada held a Federal election which resulted in the Liberal Party of Canada (LPC) being able to form a minority government with 157 deputies. The balance of power is held by the Conservative Party of Canada (CPC) at 121 deputies, the Bloc Québécois (BQ) at 32 deputies, and the New Democratic Party (NDP) at 24 deputies. A government in Canada requires at least 170 deputies to pass legislation, therefore the LPC will need at least one of the above-mentioned parties to pass environmental legislation. Based on the 2019 party platforms a few policy outcomes become possible. The LPC's carbon tax has a chance of remaining since both the NDP and the BQ support a version of it. Meanwhile, a ban on single-use plastics, forming a reforestation plan and formally protecting some of Canada's land and oceans is supported by both the LPC and the NDP. Also, a promise to end fossil fuel subsidies is supported by the LPC, the NDP, and the BQ. While all parties have said that they were committed to the 2016 Paris Climate Agreement, pipeline plans remain because the LPC and the CPC both support some pipelines (with NDP ambiguity regarding an LNG project in British Columbia).

In 2021, amid the COP26, a poll concluded that 25% of Canadians believed that international conferences on climate change were useful to fight climate change.

== Environmental landscape ==
The environmental landscape of Canada can be classified through its 15 terrestrial and 5 marine ecozones, 53 eco-provinces, 194 ecoregions, and 1021 ecodistricts. Forest cover is around 38% of the total land area, equivalent to 346,928,100 hectares (ha) of forest in 2020, down from 348,272,930 hectares (ha) in 1990. In 2020, naturally regenerating forest covered 328,764,710 hectares (ha) and planted forest covered 18,163,390 hectares (ha). Of the naturally regenerating forest 59% was reported to be primary forest (consisting of native tree species with no clearly visible indications of human activity) and around 1% of the forest area was found within protected areas. For the year 2015, 91% of the forest area was reported to be under public ownership, 8% private ownership. Canada has a variety of forest regions (especially throughout British Columbia and Alberta), possessing 9% (347 million hectares) of the world's total forest land and 24% of the world's boreal forest land. There are eight forest regions in Canada: Acadian, Boreal, Carolinian (Deciduous), Coast, Columbia, Great Lakes-St Lawrence, Montane, and Subalpine. Although, just in the summer of 2023, 18.4 million hectares of forest were destroyed because of climate change. In terms of iconic wildlife, the beaver became Canada's official emblem in 1975 for its historical significance in the fur trade. Other iconic wildlife include the Canada goose, the moose, and the polar bear.

== Environmental education ==
Education is a key factor to improve the environmental situation. Therefore, in Canada is easy to find different centers and institutions in which people can learn more about the environment. The Canadian government is funding environmental education, especially for the youth. Through this education, they will understand how climate is changing and its consequences. Eight different Canadian organizations, which received $2.9 million in funding, will work on environmental and climate literacy with the youth. For instance, the Ministry of Ontario has developed a program that consists of teaching students to create a sustainable future, not only at school but also in their daily life. There are different associations in which those who are interested in the environment can learn and go more deeply in this area. The aim of this institution is to provide more information from different perspectives. Environmental careers center of Canada (ECO) offers many different kinds of programs, from post-secondary Environmental Education in Canada to undergraduates students who have also the possibility to study a bachelor's degree in Environmental Practices from Royal Roads University and propose certificates for adults as well. Accelerating Climate Change Education (CCE), at Lakehead University, will maintain climate change education for teacher training across the country. The main purpose is to create environmental professionals. Another association is The Canadian Network for Environmental Education and Communication (EECOM) is a network for environmental learning

== The Effects of Climate Change ==
Canada is described as one of the most vulnerable regions to climate change, especially Northern Canada. During the past several summers, Canada's wildfires have increased in size and quantity. The most damaging wildfire season was recorded recently, in the summer of 2023, with high temperatures; 6623 fires destroyed 18.4 million hectares of land and released 640 million metric tons of carbon in the atmosphere. These Canadian fires released five times more carbon in the atmosphere than countries who are top emitters did during 2022, such as Russia and China. These wildfires have a huge effect on the health of Canadas residents. Air pollutants can cause many diseases that will influence respiratory and cardiovascular health.

== Environmental Issues ==
On top of the issues that climate change creates for the environment of Canada, there are also many emitters who harm the environment of Canada by releasing more emissions into the environment. Most of the time those are companies who burn fossil fuels or deal with oil, who profit from projects based on these elements. Trans Mountain Pipeline System is one of those projects. The pipeline has been transporting crude oil and refined petroleum since the 1950s from Edmonton, Alberta, to British Columbia and Washington state. Before coming to a large oil storage facility on the scenic Pacific coast, the Trans Mountain pipeline passes two provinces, flows through a national park in the Rocky Mountains, dips beneath bodies of water, and passes past hundreds of First Nations communities. Kinder Morgan, a Texas-based company, submitted an application in 2013 to increase the pipeline system's daily capacity from 300,000 barrels to 890,000 barrels. Couple years later, the Canadian Federal Government purchased the pipe line from Kinder Morgan and its expansion plan.

Because of its possible effects on the environment, the idea encountered with rapid opposition, legal challenges, and protests from First Nations and environmental groups, which delayed the process of constructing and operating the pipelines. The Canadian government and its crown business were sued by cities like Vancouver, Burnaby, the Tsleil-Waututh Nation, and six other organizations. Later, British Columbia and the Province of Alberta became plaintiffs in the lawsuit.

This pipeline project is very expensive and Canadians can lose billions from this project. Originally, this project was supposed to cost $4.5 billion (CAN), but now the cost has increased to $21.4 billion (CAN). Minister of Finance Chrystia Freeland claimed that they would sell the pipeline in order to use the funds for the country's clean energy transition. This transaction would be a financial loss and not a profit because it is most likely that no one will buy this pipeline from the Canadian government because it will be too expensive to run it Instead of finishing the project and spending billions of more dollars, that unspent money can go forward to clean energy. According to a rough estimate, Canada could spend that amount of money that is supposed to be spent on the pipeline and more than double its current solar capacity, which is now installed at about 3,000 MW. By investing those funds, the solar capacity will increase to almost 8,000 MW. About 1.6 million households, or 11% of all residences in the nation, could be powered with that amount.

== Environmental Regulations and Groups ==
One of the goals of the Canadian government is to ensure that its citizens live in a healthy and clean environment by introducing the Canadian Environmental Protection Act, of 1988 (CEPA). CEPA is designed to deal with toxic substances, most specifically the concerns about them and how they affect the environment and the people, and it is based on the regulations that were originally written in Environmental Contaminants Act (ECA). CEPA united environmental regulations that existed on a federal and provincial level, and now these authorities have an outline on how to take care of the environment responsibly.

Other Canadian Environmental Groups:

- Canadian Wildfire Federation = This federation was established in 1962 and is dedicated to conserving Canada's wildlife and habitats. This organization works with all levels of the Canadian Government in order to fulfill their goals and to increase awareness of wildlife in Canada.
- David Suzuki Foundation = David Suzuki Foundation is a non-profit organization that was established in 1990, which works on the preservation of the natural environment. This foundation works with community, government, and other non-profit organizations. Their goal is to protect and restore the most at-risk ecosystem and its species by 2030. One of their long-term goals is to preserve and reserve nature by 2050.
- Èquiterre = Èquiterre is an environmental group that was established in 1993. It was started by a group in Quebec that decided to raise questions and create solutions to problems like pollution, the effects of industrialization, and others. During the 30 years of their existence, they created conditions for change through education, research, and group work.
- Greenpeace Canada = Greenpeace is a well-known environmental organization around the world, it is known in 55 countries and has millions of supporters. Their movements started in 1971, when after their first action, the United States stopped nuclear testing on the groups at Amchitka Island, Alaska. Greenpeace puts their effort into preserving endangered species, preventing environmental abuses, and raising awareness about pollution. They are the organization that makes the government and companies pay for the damage that they cause to our environment.
- Ecojustice Canada (known as Sierra Legal Defense Fund) = This organization uses the law to defend nature to fight for a healthy environment. They use three steps to complete their goals and create change. They go to court, where they represent environmental organizations, citizens, and groups that have the same goal as this organization. For the government to create better laws for the environment, they push to strengthen environmental legislation.
- Sierra Club of Canada = The Sierra Club was established in 1892, by a naturalist John Muir, who believed in the connection between the people and the human nature. Over the next few decades, Sierra Club created its own branch in Canada. The Sierra Club Canada Foundation's current members have the responsibility of critically analyzing the ways in which racism, colonial dominance, exclusion, and dispossession have influenced the conservation movement. Building a better, more equitable, more inclusive future requires our combined efforts.
- Sierra Youth Coalition = This Canadian organization has been established in 1996, and it is ran and used by the youth. Members are included from all over the regions of Canada, from different schools and universities. This organization works with those students in order to change the environment around them, and encourages them to influence the main decision makers with their voice. Students work toward ecological preservation, sustainable communities, and better education about the environment.

== See also ==
- Canadian Environment Awards
- Environmental issues in Canada
  - Athabaska oil sands § Environmental impacts
- Environment and Climate Change Canada
- Hard Choices: Climate Change in Canada
- Interprovincial Cooperatives v. The Queen
- Pesticides in Canada
- Sustainable Development Strategy in Canada
- Environmental policy of the Harper government
