= Mercury contamination in Grassy Narrows =

Environmental & health disaster 1962 - 1970

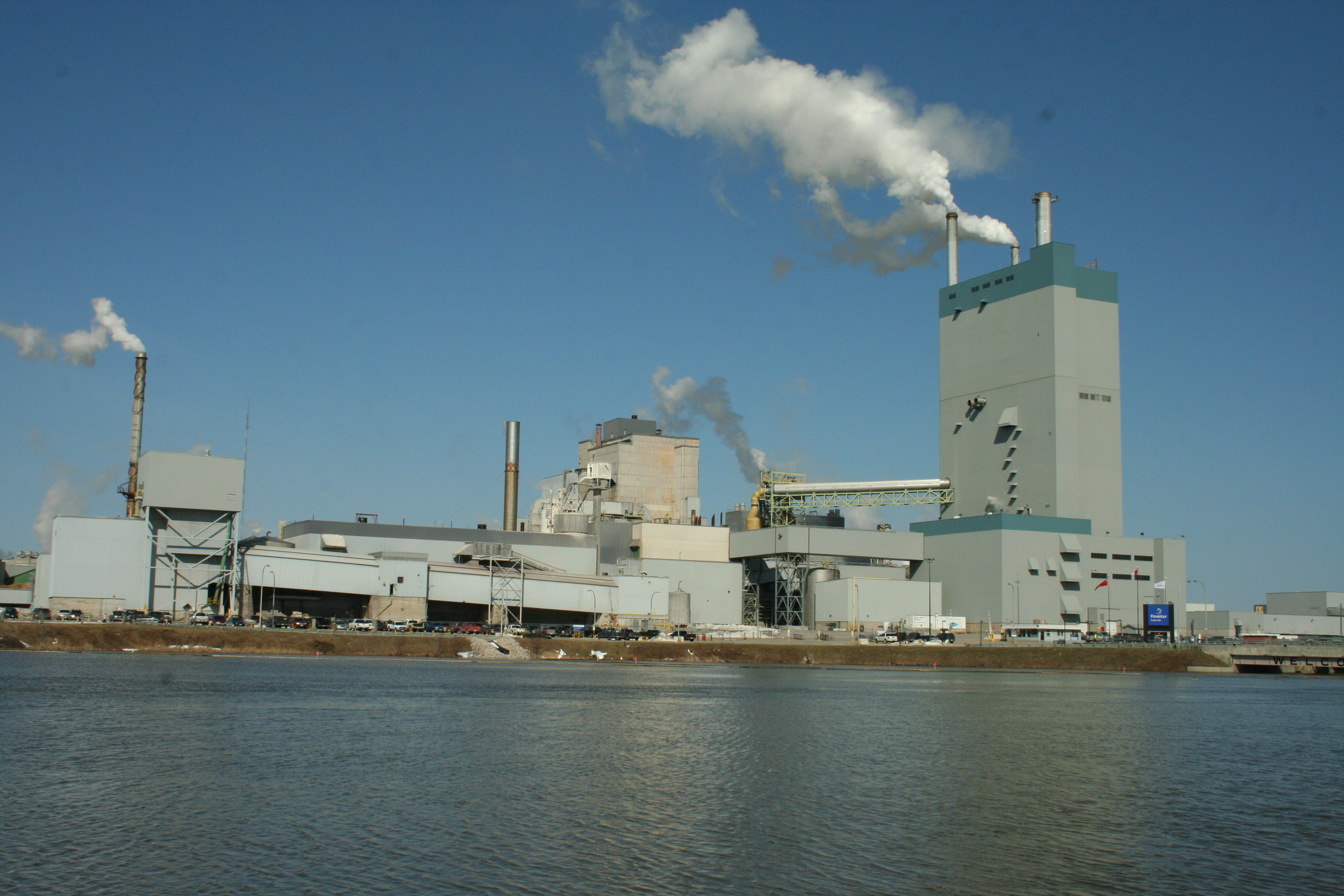
Dryden Mill

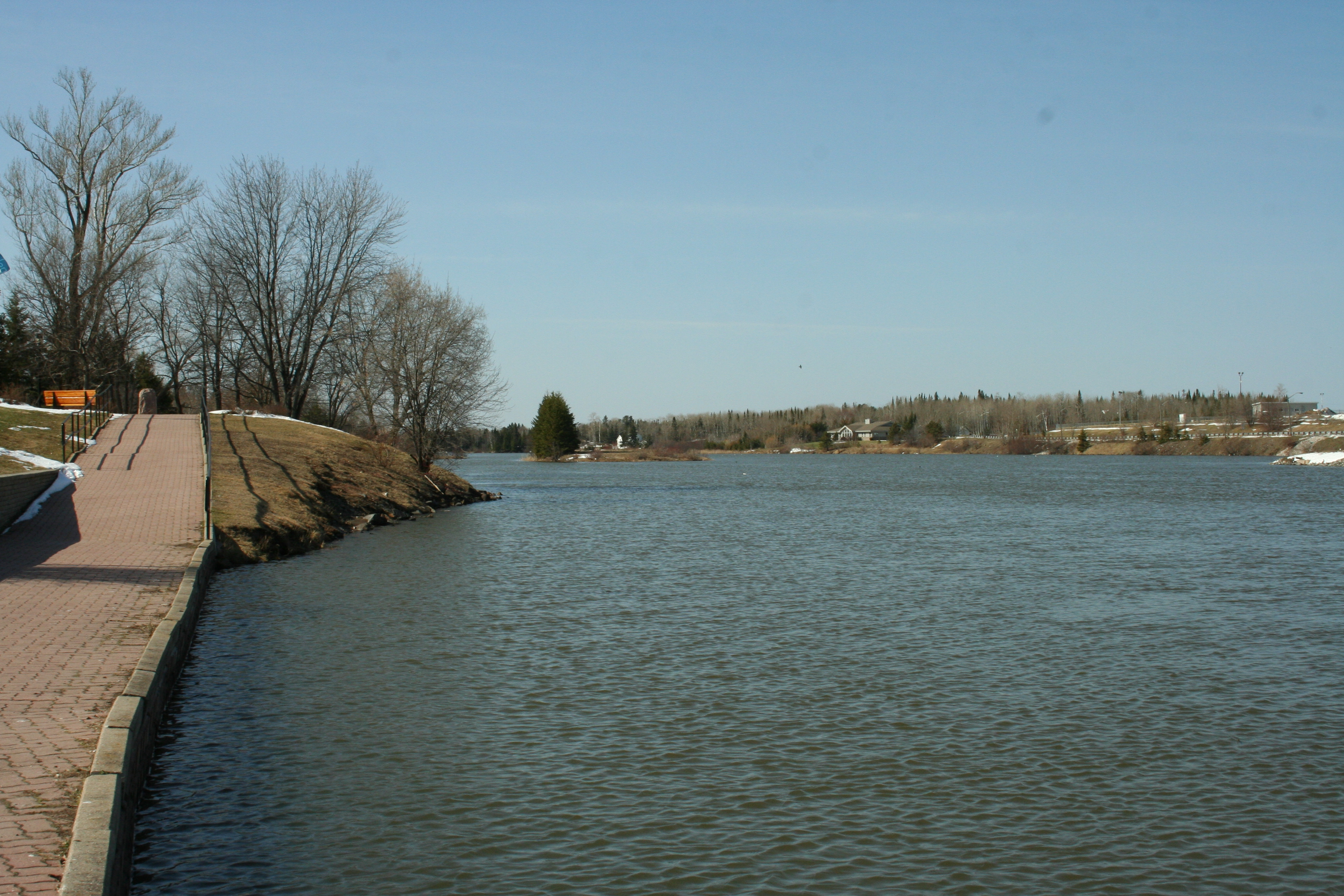
The Wabigoon river as it exits Wabigoon Lake

From 1962 to 1970, an uncontrolled mercury discharge of between 9,000 kilograms (20,000 lb) and 11,000 kilograms (24,000 lb) from the Dryden Mill's chloralkali plant in Dryden into the headwaters of the Wabigoon River in the Kenora District of Northwestern Ontario occurred. It was described as "one of the worst cases of environmental poisoning in Canadian history." The contamination poisoned many people in the Grassy Narrows First Nation and Whitedog First Nation communities.

The Wabigoon River forms a vast river system with the English River—which includes many lakes and tributaries—and together they flow west to the Winnipeg River. This aquatic ecosystem had extensive mercury contamination by 1970, leading to the closure of the commercial fishery and some tourism related businesses. The glacial clay of the area is believed to have facilitated the bioaccumulation of mercury in the ecosystem.

Clay lake, the first major lake downstream from the Dryden mill, had extremely high mercury levels in predatory fish such as the walleye. These fish, which have been a staple food of First Nations people for generations, became unsafe to eat. Grassy Narrows and Whitedog First Nation communities were severely affected. For generations, many suffered with symptoms of mercury poisoning, including Minamata disease. An expert report in 2016 confirmed that the Wabigoon River was "still highly contaminated" and that "it can be cleaned safely".

The Dryden chloralkali plant and the nearby Dryden Pulp and Paper Company were both subsidiaries of the British multinational, Reed International.

== Background ==
=== Mercury poisoning ===
Prior to the 1950s, the "scientific community was unaware of the effects of methylmercury on humans". In a 1958 article in The Lancet, two medical doctors reported their findings which confirmed a "link between methylmercury contaminated fish and human neurologic symptoms." Their research focused on what was then a "mysterious nervous illness" first noticed in a human in 1956 in a fishing village in Minamata, Japan. Odd behavior in cats in that area, later found linked to a strange neurologic condition, had been observed at that time. Although the first affected human entered the Chisso factory hospital in 1956, the disease had already reached local epidemic proportions by that time. A 1957 Kumamota Medical Journal called the condition Minamata disease.

A 2017 Canadian Medical Association Journal (CMAJ) noted that while investigations in Japan had been proceeding in the 1960s and 1970s, a similar case of a local epidemic of mercury poisoning was unfolding in Northern Canada. By 2017, however, in Canada, problems have left the Grassy Narrows First Nation still grappling with the "ravages of mercury contamination".

A 2016 CMAJ article on managing mercury exposure in Canada, said that the current clinical guidance on fish consumption is "poorly adapted to the circumstances of geographically remote northern communities, for whom mercury exposure may be greater." The article said that the fetus is especially at risk to "deleterious neurologic effects" of the toxic effects of mercury poisoning. The authors said that "most Canadians are exposed to mercury through diet, specifically fish consumption. Catherine Pirkle's team of researchers said that in northern indigenous communities there is "highly prevalent food insecurity" that is "associated with a rapid transition toward store-bought foods and decreasing access to local natural resources". The article said that current publications regarding the recognition of "clinically important mercury levels and appropriate interventions" is inadequate in dealing with "remote northern communities for whom mercury exposure may be greater."

=== Grassy Narrows First Nation ===
The semi-remote Grassy Narrows is one of 28 First Nations within the Grand Council Anishinaabe Nation in Treaty No. 3, a sovereign Anishinaabe Nation. The Grassy Narrows reserve is less than 100 kilometres (62 mi) downstream from the Dryden mill. The Whitedog reserve is several hundred kilometres further downstream. Both First Nations communities were severely affected. For generations, many suffered with symptoms of mercury poisoning, including Minamata disease.

== Contamination in Ontario ==
Starting in the 1960s, the Canadian federal government began to take action regarding mercury contamination in fish. The "first investigation of mercurial contamination" in a First Nations community took place in the fall of 1970 on the Grassy Narrows and Whitedog (Wabaseemoong) reserves. The government knew that Reed Paper Group's chloralkali plant, established in 1962, had discharged over 9 tons of metallic mercury into the river system. In addition, an article said that the majority of inhabitants consumed three meals of fish daily during the spring, summer and fall as they were "known to be wholly dependent upon fishing, hunting, guiding, and forestry."

From 1962 to 1970, the Dryden Chemical Company's chloralkali plant, which was associated with the nearby Dryden Pulp and Paper Company—both subsidiaries of the British multinational Reed Paper Group—discharged approximately 10,000 kilograms (22,000 lb) of mercury into the Wabigoon-English river systems. (Note: The environmental analysis based on the Grassy Narrows case study of methyl-mercury pollution by Anne McDonald presented at the Japanese Association for Canadian Studies conference in 2007, cited Dryden Chemical Company and nearby Dryden Pulp and Paper Company as subsidiaries of the British multinational, Reed International. A 2014 article in the Star said that Reed Paper Company bought out the Dryden Pulp and Paper Company and its sister-company Dryden Chemical Company in 1985, A December 6, 2019 article by Global News reported that in c. 2011 "Weyerhaeuser Co—and a firm that later became Resolute Forest Products"— were obligated to "care for" the Dryden "mercury waste-disposal site" with its "toxic material" from the "pulp-and-paper mill's operations." The Free Grassy article said that Reed Paper Company that bought-out the Dryden Pulp and Paper Company and its sister-company Dryden Chemical Company. Global News reported on the December 6, 2019, Supreme Court of Canada ruling that Weyerhaeuser Company and Resolute Forest Products—previously known as Abitibi-Consolidated were responsible for cleaning the mercury-contaminated site near Grassy Narrows First Nation.) The Dryden pulp-and-paper operations were located on the shores of the Wabigoon River near Wabigoon Lake, the river's headwater. Robert W. Billingsley, who was president of Reed International at the time of the discharge, said in a March 23, 1976 episode of The Fifth Estate about the incidents of Minamata disease upriver from the factory, that "it was pointed out that in almost any sample you would find, perhaps 5% of the population of Toronto that would show symptoms of Minamata disease—headaches, for example, is a symptom."

Reed International, known as Reed Elsevier from 1991 to February 2015, and since known as RELX, is a 6-billion USD London-based "conglomerate which included the largest publishing company in the world and published the largest newspaper in the Western Hemisphere". In 1976, Reed Limited requested permission from the Ontario government to log nearly 50,000 square kilometres (19,000 sq mi) of boreal forest in northwest Ontario. The provincial government accepted Reed's proposal in a Memorandum of Understanding but had to eventually abandon it while facing "public outcry". In 1976, the Government of Ontario launched the Royal Commission on the Northern Environment, in response to Reed Ltd's intention to construct a new pulp and paper mill and the granting to Reed of the "largest tract of forest land ever given to a single company".

Since the mercury poisoning, members of the Grassy Narrows community "have lived with the consequences of one of the worst cases of environmental poisoning in Canadian history", according to The Lancet.

== Initial investigations and actions ==
In their final report submitted to the Attorney General of Ontario on June 28, 1985, in regards to the mercury contamination of the river system used by the Grassy Narrows and White Dog First Nations "from which these communities derived employment and sustenance", the commission recommended that "until the claims of White Dog and Grassy Narrows are settled, the Government of Ontario should not grant any cutting rights to Great Lakes Forest Products Ltd., or any subsequent owner of the Dryden Mill Complex, in forest land outside existing company management units."

In 1970, Fisheries Research Board of Canada's scientist E. G. Bligh had found a number of chlorine plants in Canada were "significant mercury polluters of fish and fish eating birds". Bligh documented "extremely high mercury levels in predatory fish" from the Wabagoon-English river systems, particularly in Clay Lake which is 50 miles (80 km) from Dryden, and is the first major downstream lake in the Wabagoon-English River system.

The discovery of extensive mercury contamination in the river system led to the closure of the commercial fishery and some tourism-related businesses.

On April 6, 1970, René Brunelle, then "Ontario Minister of Lands and Forests closed all commercial and sport fishing in the Wabigoon River below Dryden up to and including Clay Lake. On May 1, he announced that commercial fishing was closed on Ball, Lount, Indian, Grassy Narrows, Separation, Umfreville, Tetu, Swan, and Eaglenest Lakes." While the ban on sport fishing was lifted, anglers were warned that their catches were unfit for consumption. On 13 August 1970, George Albert Kerr (1924 – 2007) then Minister of Energy and Resources Management of Ontario, reassured the local community that the Wabigoon river would recover naturally within twelve weeks without government intervention or a cleanup. In a speech to the Ontario parliament in 2010, MP Norman W. Sterling said that Kerr had made up the estimate of twelve weeks, and quoted Kerr as saying, "If I had said it was going to be flushed out in one or two years, they would never have believed me." Sterling's words were "met with laughter in the Ontario parliament". Kerr was named as Ontario's Minister of the Environment on July 23, 1971. Prior to this there was no environment ministry in Canada.

== Effects on local communities ==
"The story of my people, the Grassy Narrows First Nation, weighs heavily on the collective conscience of Canada. For over half a century, mercury poison has contaminated the river that is our lifeblood."

— Grassy Narrows Grand Chief Simon Fobister Sr. June 6, 2016. The Star.

To the local community, April 6, 1970, marked the "dividing line between a growing, employed and prosperous traditional community, and an era of disease, government inaction, and Ojibway resistance". To those elders who lived before that time, there were memories of how "all the families in the community would be fishing. Every household went fishing. They sold their fish to the Kenora market." Many also had worked as fishing guides to supplement income. A former chief who has all the "symptoms of advanced mercury-induced disease are evident: the slurred speech, the twisted and cramped arms, the twitch and part paralysis of his face", said, "It was a good life...In our bodies, in our minds, we're always going to be gathering off the land."

Barney and Marion Lamm's Ball Lake Lodge—where the English and Wabigoon rivers meet—150 kilometres (93 mi) downstream of the Dryden factory, since its opening in 1947, had employed about 300 Grassy Narrows community members year-round as "fishing guides for wealthy tourists". One of the features offered to tourists was the "shore lunch", where the guides would prepare the fish that the tourists had freshly caught. The guides would regularly eat the fish with the guests. When the Lamms were forced to close their profitable multimillion-dollar Ball Lake Lodge, they filed a 1971 lawsuit against Lamm sued Dryden Chemical Company for $3.75 million in damages. To prepare for the lawsuit they hired a University of Western Ontario graduate student, Norvald Fimreite, to "study mercury levels in local flora and fauna" which revealed, "mercury levels far exceeding international standards, among the highest recorded in the Western hemisphere". The Lamm collection of documents in preparation for the lawsuit is now in held at Harvard, Cambridge, Massachusetts. While gathering documentation on the mercury contamination, Lamm invited the Smiths—photojournalists were working on their book Minamata—to visit Grassy Narrows. The Smiths said that observable symptoms in Grassy Narrows residents resembled those in people she had seen in Minamata. This was the first connection between the Minamata mercury poisoning and Grassy Narrow. Eventually, Kumamoto University's Masazumi Harada conducting analyses of hair specimens from Grassy Narrows. Harada found that 87 Grassy Narrows residents were over the safe limit of 100 ppb, with 61 samples "in the 100–199 ppb range and 26 exceeding 200 ppb."

The closest reserve to the paper mill is Grassy Narrows reserve, which is less than 100 kilometres (62 mi) downstream of the Dryden factory. The Whitedog reserve is several hundred kilometres further downstream. Both First Nations communities were severely affected. For generations many suffered from mercury poisoning, including Minamata disease—a neurological syndrome caused by severe mercury poisoning. Generations of Grassy Narrows residents continue to suffer from the physical, social, and economic costs of the discharge of approximately ten tons of mercury into the Wabigoon River between 1962 and 1970 by the Dryden factory, 100 kilometres (62 mi) upstream of Grassy Narrows, poisoning the water and the fish—the staple food of the Grassy Narrows First Nations. It is "one of Canada's worst environmental disasters".

== Lasting impacts and subsequent studies ==
=== 1970s ===
In the 1970s, the Medical Service Branch of Health Canada—the agency responsible for Canada's national health policy—undertook yearly biomarker testing of blood and hair for Hg of all 657 Registered members of the Grassy Narrows First Nation. This was part of a larger study of First Nations and Inuit who continued to live a traditional subsistence lifestyle by hunting, fishing and gathering. This placed them at higher possibility of risk of exposure to "contaminants, such as methylmercury MeHg, which bioaccumulate in aquatic ecosystems."

A 1973 study found that from 1962 to 1969, between 9,000 kilograms (20,000 lb) and 11,000 kilograms (24,000 lb) of mercury was discharged into the river system. The Ontario provincial government—under the leadership of then Premier John Robarts (1917–1982) whose term lasted from November 8, 1961 to March 1, 1971—served Dryden Chemical Company with an ordinance on March 26, 1970 "ordering the company to cease dumping mercury into the English-Wabigoon river system". Since the 1971 ordinance only mentioned direct dumping into the river, airborne mercury emissions continued until October 1975. Dryden Chemical ceased operations in 1976. Even though discharges were controlled after 1970, by 1973, the Hg concentrations in fish were "10 times above the legal limit for human consumption."

In 1975, Kumamoto University's Masazumi Harada conducted analyses of hair specimens from Grassy Narrows. Harada found that 87 Grassy Narrows residents were over the safe limit of 100 ppb, with 61 samples "in the 100–199 ppb range and 26 exceeding 200 ppb." He reported that the levels were "more than three times the Health Canada limit in Grassy Narrows and seven times the limit in nearby Whitedog". Harada returned to do more testing in 2004, and found that "all of the people who had tested over the limit were dead." In response to these tests, Leo Bernier, who was the Ontario Minister of Natural Resources in 1975, said on CBC's As It Happens that there were "no real damages" to the First Nations of the Grassy Narrows and Whitedog areas and that the federal authorities had verified that. The Center for Minamata Studies in Japan continued to chronicle Minamata disease at Grassy Narrows for decades. According to the New York Times, the centre's director, Masanori Hanada, could not understand why in 2014—decades after the mercury discharge—an estimated 90% of Grassy Narrows residents, including newborns, had "symptoms of mercury poisoning". Symptoms included "numbness in the extremities, tremors, memory loss, tunnel vision, [and] birth defects."

By 1975, with the fisheries closed the unemployment rate in Grassy Narrows "rose from 5% to over 90%" and "welfare rolls increased from $9,000 to $140,000".

In response to the mercury contamination, Grassy Narrows and Whitedog reserves formed the Anti-Mercury Ojibwa Group (AMOG) in 1975 as part of their preparation for legal action. AMOG commissioned the report entitled, "The economic and social impact of mercury pollution on the Whitedog and Grassy Narrows Indian Reserves, Ontario", which was published in 1979.

A 1976 Canadian Medical Association Journal article "Methyl mercury poisoning in Canada", disregarded the data from Harada, because they did not factor in "fully-developed intoxication".

A 1977 report by a Health and Welfare Canada's Task Force on Organic Mercury in the Environment that was formed in 1972, submitted a report that said that found that "despite elevated mercury levels, the clinical tests performed on six locals showed no acute or chronic effects of methyl-mercury poisoning."

In a March 23, 1976 The Fifth Estate episode, reporter Warner Troyer interviewed Robert Billingsley—President of Reed International, Peter Newberry—a physician who worked on mercury toxicity with Grassy Narrows members, and Marcel Pahpasay—a First Nations fishing guide, whose 3-year-old son Keith was diagnosed with cerebral palsy in spite of symptoms that were identical to children with Minamata disease. Troyer is also the author of No Safe Place published in 1977. In his book, Troyer said that a "1975 federally commissioned study was suppressed because it found 45 Indians had eyesight problems known as "visual field losses" consistent with mercury poisoning. The federal Health Department official who commissioned the study later told reporters the study was flawed."

In a January 1, 1978 article entitled "Mercury contamination: A human tragedy", published in Environmental Management co-authors Patricia A. D'ltri and Frank M. D'ltri said that the Dryden Chemical Company began operating a chloralkali process plant in Dryden, Ontario in 1962 using mercury cells. They reported on First Nations community members, who lived downstream from the Dryden factory with Minamata, Japan, that was "ravaged by the effects of methylmercury poisoning". It produced sodium hydroxide and chlorine that were used in large amounts for bleaching paper during production by the Dryden Pulp and Paper Company.

=== 1980s ===
On March 26, 1982, Canada contributed $2.2 million to Wabaseemoong for economic development, social and educational programs. Wabaseemoong also signed a settlement with Ontario in January 1983. On July 27, 1984, the federal government contributed $4.4 million to Grassy Narrows for economic development and social service development/planning.

In their 1983 report based on a 3-year study, a team of government scientists led by John Rudd, found that the English–Wabigoon River System was "one of the most heavily Hg-contaminated waterways in Canada." The Wabigoon River flows west from Wabigoon Lake—the headwater of the Wabigoon River—to the outfall of Ball Lake where it joins the English River system. These combined rivers flow into the Winnipeg River, and eventually into Lake Winnipeg. The Grassy Narrows reserve is located 100 km downstream of Dryden and the mill and several hundred kilometres upstream of the Wabaseemong reserve. The glacial clay which is typical of area from Dryden to the outflow of the river system at Clay Lake, particularly and the high turbidity of the river system is "believed to have an important influence on rates of Hg bioaccumulation. Clay Lake is the first major downstream lake in the Wabagoon-English River system. Bacteria in the water metabolize inorganic mercury (Hg) into methylmercury—which is extremely toxic and bioaccumulative. "[M]ethyl-mercury can negatively affect reproduction rates, and behaviour and physical development in fish and fish-eating birds and mammals, including humans".

Predator fish such as walleye, northern pike, large-mouth bass, and whitefish accumulate more methyl-mercury by eating smaller fish. The glacial clay of the area is believed to have facilitated the bioaccumulation of mercury in rivers and lakes in the ecosystem. Animals at the bottom of the food chain, such as small fish eat the methyl-mercury which can never be dissolved. Clay Lake, which is 50 miles (80 km) from the mill and is the major lake downstream from the Dryden mill, had "extremely high mercury levels in predatory fish". Walleye is a key traditional species of the Grassy Narrows First Nation and they have fished at "Clay Lake and the river downstream" for many generations.

In 1984, the environment minister at that time said that the river was cleaning itself, and there was no need for government intervention.

In 1985, the Reed Paper Company that bought out the Dryden Pulp and Paper Company and its sister-company Dryden Chemical Company, Great Lakes Forest Products, the governments of Canada and Ontario provided approximately $17 million in compensation to the Grassy Narrows and Wabaseemoong First Nations as part of a legal settlement for the health effects of mercury in their communities. In 1985, the province of Ontario granted the "Dryden mill and any future owners a broad indemnity, assuming all environmental liabilities related to the mill and its mercury dumping." According to the Department of Indian Affairs and Northern Development's Ontario Region, a Memorandum of Agreement (MOA) reached in 1985 between the federal government, the Ontario government, Reed Limited, and Great Lakes Forest Products Ltd. resulted in a one-time compensation payment of $16.67 million with the federal government contributing $2 million. Through the 1986 "Grassy Narrows and Islington Indian Bands Mercury Pollution Claims Settlement Act", the Kenora, Ontario-based Mercury Disability Fund (MDF) and the Mercury Disability Board were established. The Government of Ontario held $2 million of this settlement in a trust fund which the province is "responsible for replenishing when the balance drops below $100,000".

=== 21st century ===
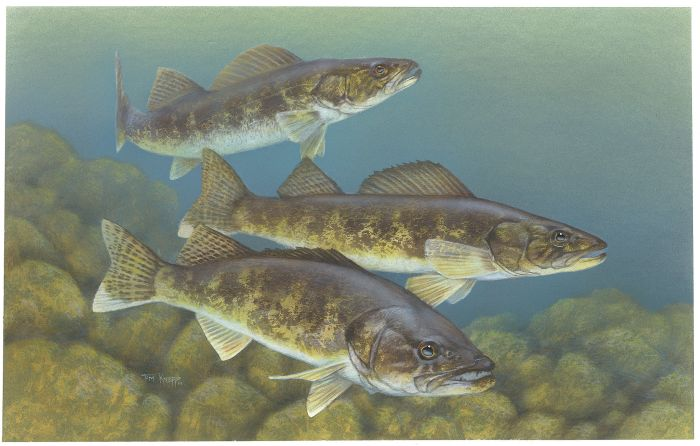
Walleye fish

In March 2003, based on a study of mercury in whitefish, a recommended fish consumption guideline was made and shared with local communities. It was recommended that members eat shorter, younger fish. Whitefish was recommended over walleye, pike, and bass; however, "many fishers show a preference for longer fish, as they provide more edible flesh and a greater 'trophy' value."

By 2014, a number of academic publications described the situation in Grassy Narrows as a "local epidemic of Minamata disease...linked to the consumption of fish contaminated by mercury.

In September 2014, a team from Japan's Center for Minamata Studies including Masanori Hanada, director of the centre, spent two weeks in Grassy Narrows following up on their studies that began in the 1970s. Hanada met with community members and Margaret Wanlin, who was the chairperson of the Mercury Disability Board. Wanlin said that since 1986 the Board has "distributed $17 million dollars in disability pensions" which represents an average payment of $400 per month. Wanlin told CBC that only 243 of the 910 people who have applied for Mercury Disability Board were accepted by the board. Hanada told CBC reporter Jody Porter, that the residents of Grassy Narrows have mercury poisoning and that the Board's "functional assessments" were not a "good measure of who is suffering".

In July 2015, a then-65-year old Albertan wrote to the Chief of Grassy Narrows, saying that, in 1972, when he was 21 years old, he had worked for the Dryden paper mill. As part of his job, he shovelled mercury into drums. He and others in a "small crew" had "dumped approximately 50 drums containing liquid mercury and salt—industrial waste from the mill—into a large pit upstream of Grassy Narrows".

In July 2015, when the former mill worker had come forward with the information about burying 50 barrels of mercury upstream of Grassy Narrows, some scientists believe this might explain why community members, including newborns, have symptoms of mercury poisoning decades after the initial dumping of mercury in the waterways. The Ministry of the Environment undertook geophysical testing following this report but found no barrels.

Using statistical data on "violent death, illness, and family breakdown", Anastasia Shkilnyk, the author of Poison Stronger than Love: The Destruction of an Ojibwa Community, traced the history and described the "devastating impacts of mercury contamination on the health and livelihood of the Grassy Narrows".

The Minamata Convention on Mercury in 2016—the sixtieth anniversary of the discovery of the disease, by the same name—announced the signing of the "international treaty designed to protect human health and the environment from anthropogenic releases and emission of mercury and mercury compounds" on April 22, 2016—Earth Day. In 2016 and 2017, there was wide coverage of the mercury contamination of the river ways, including in-depth coverage by Toronto Star journalists Jayme Poisson and David Bruser. Poisson and Bruser reported that the government of Ontario had known about the mercury contamination for decades but did nothing. CBC published an interactive article by Jody Porter called "Children of the poisoned river". Porter called the contamination "one of Canada's worst environmental disasters".

In 2016, Judy Da Silva (b. 1960)—Grassy Narrows environment and health coordinator—joined a delegation of Indigenous Canadians to present Grassy Narrows' case for safe drinking water to the UN Committee on Economic, Social, and Cultural Rights. Da Silva told the committee that Canada had violated their rights by "failing to address mercury pollution in Grassy Narrows". In a 2016 interview with the Star, Da Silva said that there had never been an apology. According to an article in The Lancet, Da Silva "spent her life leading the struggle for recognition of the harm that Hg has done to her community."

A 2016 confidential report by an environmental consulting firm, commissioned by Domtar—who have owned and operated the Dryden pulp and paper mill since 2007—revealed that Ontario provincial authorities "knew decades ago that the site of the mill was contaminated with mercury," according to a 2017 article in the Star. The report included archival reports from the mill which showed that groundwater samples collected by the company over many years had "extremely high mercury levels". In February 2016, Ontario's Ministry of the Environment said that there was no need for remediation other than natural sedimentation. In 2015, a former mill employee reported that when he worked for the mill in the early 1970s and had been "part of a group who 'haphazardly' dumped drums filled with salt and mercury into a pit behind the mill".

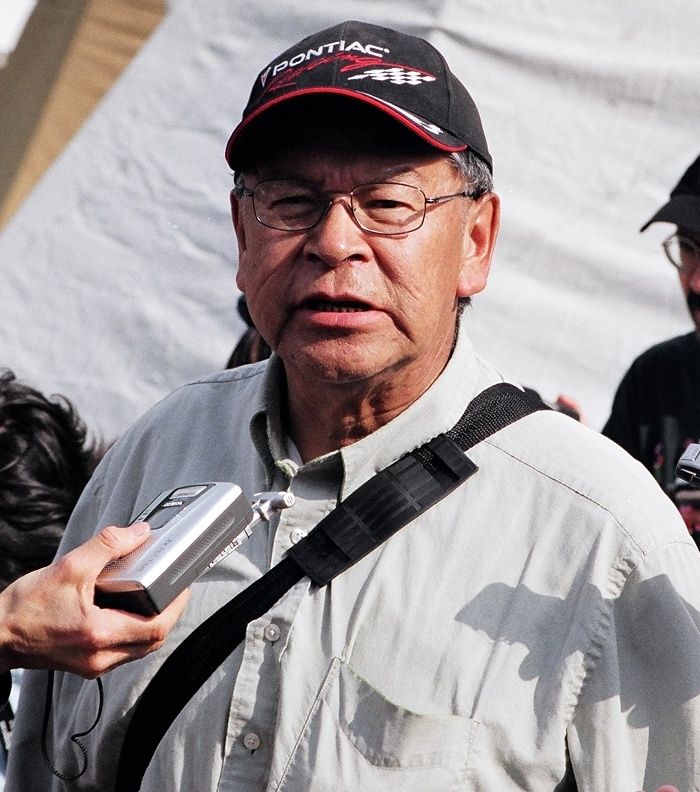
Elder Bill Fobister, speaking at a protest at Queen's Park in Toronto

On June 6, 2016, Grand Chief Fobister led a march with a thousand protestors in downtown Toronto, to "demand a clean up of the mercury poison that has been left in their river for over 50 years". Chief Fobister announced that an expert report, which was released on June 6, 2016 had found that the river was "still highly contaminated" and that "it can be cleaned safely".

In February 2017, five mercury experts—including John Rudd—submitted their report, which had been commissioned by the Grassy Narrows community which "suggests there is ongoing mercury contamination" from the Dryden mill—"decommissioned decades ago". The study which was funded by the Ontario government, included tests conducted in the summer of 2016, with sediment samples taken from the Wabigoon River "as it passes by the mill, as well as from two lakes upstream of the site." Rudd told Maclean's that the "mercury levels downstream of the plant should have returned to normal by now in the absence of leaks, but the tests show significantly higher levels downstream of the plant compared with upstream locations—roughly 130 times higher." The Ministry of the Environment tested the "entire mill site after an environmental group announced it had found high levels of mercury in soil samples".

In the summer of 2017, the government of Ontario committed $85 million to clean up the Wabigoon River/English River systems, and early preparation work was completed.

Canada Research Chair in Environment and Geography at the University of Western Ontario—Brian Branfireun—told Maclean's that there are several remediation options depending on the source of the leak. If it is through groundwater, they could use a "pump-and-treat remediation, in which tainted water is captured in wells before it can reach the river and sent for treatment." If "the source is old sediment eroding from near the mill site, then the removal of that contaminated sediment could be the solution". Experimental Lakes Area researchers are concerned that a disturbance of sediment containing mercury, might inadvertently redistribute the mercury "in the ecosystem."

In her 2017 report, "Good Choices, Bad Choices: Environmental Rights and Environment Protection in Ontario", Diane Saxe, the Environmental Commissioner of Ontario, said that the effects of mercury poisoning on Grassy Narrows and Whitedog community members are "devastating" and that, "after more than 60 years, the problem is getting worse, not better." Methylmercury accumulates in the body over a lifetime, creating a devastating situation for the Grassy Narrows and Whitedog communities. Her report said that more than 58% of the "Grassy Narrows and Wabaseemoong community members have been diagnosed with—or are suspected of having—Minamata disease.

The Grassy Narrows community was under a long-term drinking water advisory from about 2013 through October 2020, when it was lifted.

In 2019, Grassy Narrows had obtained their historical Hg biomarker data from a surveillance programme undertaken by the government, which collected data measuring yearly Hg concentrations in hair samples from 657 community members between January 1, 1970 and January 31, 1997.

In a 4–3 decision on December 6, 2019, the Supreme Court of Canada ruled that Weyerhaeuser Company and Resolute Forest Products, previously known as Abitibi-Consolidated, are responsible for cleaning the mercury-contaminated site near Grassy Narrows First Nation. According to Global News, the Court decision "brought some clarity to a long-running dispute over one element of the legacy of environmental poisoning that has caused significant health problems for many residents."

In the spring of 2020, the Government of Canada reached an agreement with Grassy Narrows to "build a $20 million clinic for those suffering from mercury poisoning".

In 2020, a team of researchers funded by the Canadian Institutes of Health Research reported on their retrospective longitudinal study of mercury exposure in individuals of the Grassy Narrows First Nation community.

== See also ==
- Grassy Narrows road blockade
- Mercury in fish
- Mercury pollution in Canada
- 1971 Iraq poison grain disaster
- Methylmercury
- Mercury poisoning
- Long-term Drinking Water Advisories (DWA)s (Canada)
- Pakootas v. Teck Cominco Metals
- Interprovincial Cooperatives Ltd v R
