= Pakootas v. Teck Cominco Metals =

- Court: District Court for the Eastern District of Washington
- Full case name: Joseph A. Pakootas, an individual and enrolled member of the Confederated Tribes of the Colville Reservation; Donald R. Michel, an individual and enrolled member of the Confederated Tribes of the Coville Reservation; Confederated Tribes of the Colville Reservation vs Teck Cominco Metals

Pakootas v. Teck Cominco Metals is a citizen lawsuit filed under the 1980 Comprehensive Environmental Response, Compensation, and Liability Act (CERCLA) by Joseph A. Pakootas and Donald R. Michel brought to the United States District Court for the Eastern District of Washington against Teck Cominco—, now Teck Resources—which is headquartered in Canada. Pakootas and Michel filed the suit The plaintiffs, Pakootas and Michel, were enrolled members of the Confederated Tribes of the Colville Reservation who, under CERCLA's citizen suit provision filed the suit to enforce the "Unilateral Administrative Order for Remedial Investigation/Feasibility Study (UAO) issued to the defendant by the United States Environmental Protection Agency (EPA).

== Background ==
The lead and zinc smelter, located 10 miles (16 km) north of the United States-Canadian border. The smelter has been in operation since the early 1900s. Teck Cominco has discharged approximately 10 million to 20 million tons of smelting byproduct, which contained "lead, arsenic and mercury" into the Columbia River and Franklin D. Roosevelt Lake in Washington.

== District court ==
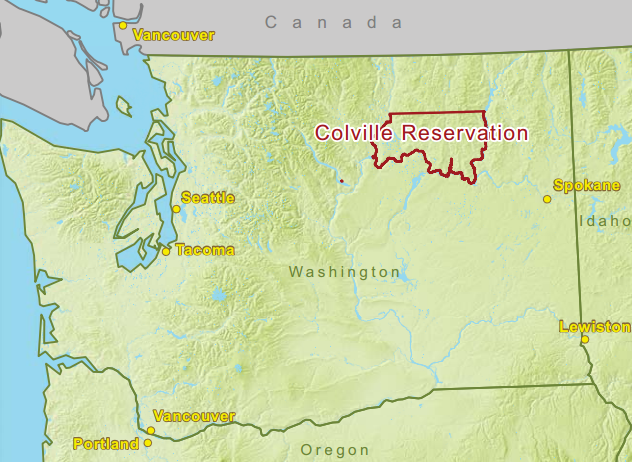
Colville Reservation

The Confederated Tribes of the Colville Reservation in Washington State filed a complaint, requesting that the United States District Court for the Eastern District of Washington to enforce fines and penalties imposed on Teck Cominco by the U.S. Environmental Protection Agency. The case concerns multilateral environmental agreements also known as international environmental agreements. (Note: The full title of the case is Joseph A. Pakootas, Donald R. Michel (Plaintiffs) v. Teck Cominco Metals, Ltd. (Defendant), the party is United States of America, date was November 8, 2004, data source was InforMEA, the court was United States District Court Washington, presided by Justice(s) McDonald, the Reference number was NO. CV-04-256-AAM, terms referenced include illegal trade, hazardous substance, ECOLEX Subjects include Water, Waste & hazardous substances, and legal questions)

== Court of Appeals ==
On June 1, 2011, Circuit Judges Arthur L. Alarcón, Andrew J. Kleinfeld, and Richard R. Clifton in the United States Court of Appeals for the Ninth Circuit Joseph A. Pakootas, an individual and enrolled member of the Confederated Tribes of the Colville Reservation; Donald R. Michel, an individual and enrolled member of the Confederated Tribes of the Coville Reservation; Confederated Tribes of the Colville Reservation vs Teck Cominco Metals, a Canadian corporation, Defendant–Appellee.

The case was appealed from the United States District Court for the Eastern District of Washington with District Judge Lonny R. Suko presiding was argued and submitted on February 5, 2018, in Seattle, Washington and filed on September 14, 2018.

== Supreme Court of the United States ==
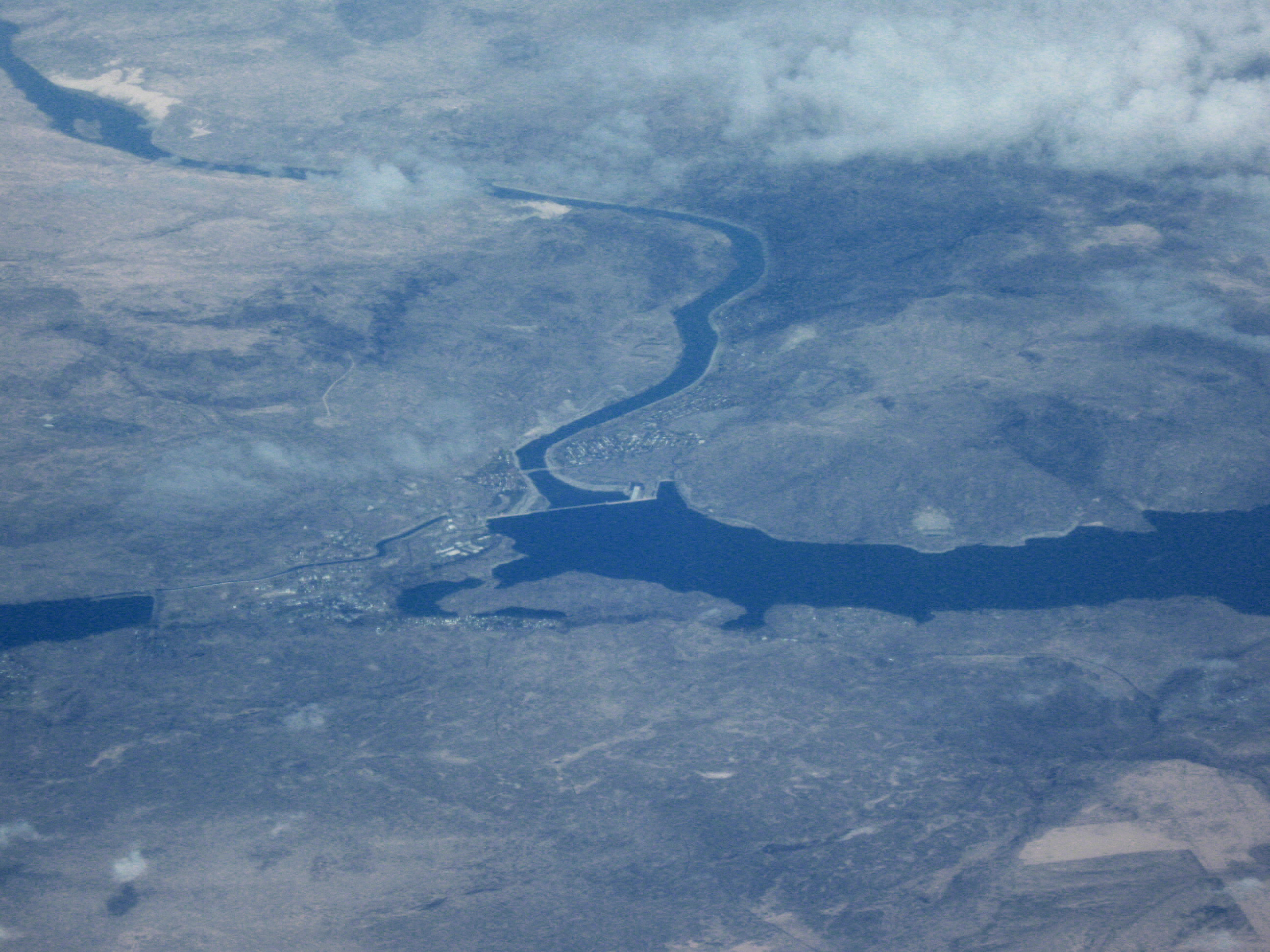
Franklin Delano Roosevelt Lake

The Supreme Court of the United States (SCOTUS) rejected Teck Metals' Petition for certiorari on June 10, 2019, in Teck Metals Ltd. v. The Confederated Tribes of the Colville Reservation. The Whether the U.S. Court of Appeals for the 9th Circuit correctly concluded that holding Teck liable for its discharges in Canada was not an impermissible extraterritorial application of the Comprehensive Environmental Response, Compensation and Liability Act; correctly held that a State may exercise specific personal jurisdiction over a defendant because the defendant knew its conduct would have in-state effects, when the defendant's relevant conduct occurred elsewhere; and (3) whether the U.S. Court of Appeals for the 9th Circuit—in conflict with the U.S. Court of Appeals for the 1st Circuit, and in tension with the opinions of the Supreme Court and several other circuits—correctly held that a defendant can be an “arranger” under CERCLA even if the defendant did not arrange for anyone else to dispose of or treat the waste.

== Implications for extraterritorial application of laws ==
Smoke pollution from the historical Cominco smelter in Trail, British Columbia resulted in the Trail Smelter dispute. Pakootas v Teck was cited in a 2001 Utrecht Journal of International and European Law as a "particularly relevant example of the reluctance of US courts to ignore the presumption against the extraterritorial application of laws."

== See also ==
- Trail Smelter dispute
- Teck Resources
- Mercury contamination in Grassy Narrows, Ontario, Canada
