= Interprovincial Cooperatives Ltd v R =

- Supreme Court of Canada

Hearing: 8, 11–12 March 1974 Judgment: 26 March 1975
- Full case name: Interprovincial Co-Operatives Limited and Dryden Chemicals Limited v Her Majesty The Queen in right of the Province of Manitoba
- Citations: [1976] 1 SCR 477
- Prior history: APPEAL from Interprovincial Cooperatives Ltd v R, [1973] 38 DLR (3d) 367 (Man CA)
- Ruling: Appeal allowed

Court membership
- Chief Justice: Bora Laskin; Puisne Justices: Ronald Martland, Wilfred Judson, Roland Ritchie, Wishart Spence, Louis-Philippe Pigeon, Brian Dickson, Jean Beetz, Louis-Philippe de Grandpré

Reasons given
- Majority: Pigeon J, joined by Martland and Beetz JJ
- Concurrence: Ritchie J
- Dissent: Laskin CJ, joined by Judson and Spence JJ
- Dickson and de Grandpré JJ took no part in the consideration or decision of the case.

Interprovincial Cooperatives Ltd v R (1975), [1976] 1 SCR 477 (also called Interprovincial Co-Operatives Ltd. v. Dryden Chemicals Ltd.) is a leading decision of the Supreme Court of Canada on the constitutional limits of provincial powers.

Manitoba had enacted a law that granted individuals resident in the province who were harmed by river pollution originating from Saskatchewan and Ontario a right of action to sue the polluting companies based outside of the province.

Justice Ritchie, writing for the Court, held that such a statutory right of action was outside of their constitutional power to enact legislation related to property and civil rights within the province under section 92(16) of the Constitution Act, 1867. The pollutant companies were properly licensed by the provincial governments of Ontario and Saskatchewan and could not be disrupted by Manitoba.

In a concurring reason by Justice Pigeon, he argued that the licence was not relevant but rather the fact that the polluting act occurred outside of Manitoba is enough to be outside the province's authority.

Chief Justice Laskin, in dissent, argued that the legislation was valid on the basis that it was intended to redress harm done within the province and that the extraterritorial effect was only ancillary to the main purpose.

== See also ==
- Environment of Canada
- R. v. Thomas Equipment Ltd., [1979] 2 S.C.R. 529

== See also ==
- List of Supreme Court of Canada cases
