= InforMEA =

Online information portal run by the United Nations

- Formation: 2009
- Legal status: Active
- Headquarters: Nairobi, Kenya
- Website: www.informea.org

InforMEA is the United Nations Information Portal on Multilateral Environmental Agreements, an online portal that provides information about the Multilateral Environmental Agreements (MEA's) to the public. The InforMEA initiative is facilitated by the United Nations Environment Programme and supported by the European Union. It seeks to develop Interoperable information systems for the benefit of the (MEA)Parties and the environment community at large.

Since the launch of the InforMEA platform in 2011 the services of InforMEA have expanded from providing a Thesaurus on Environmental Law and Conventions to enabling access to MEA-related information in the form of decisions, resolutions, news, calendars of events, a glossary, lists of Parties, national focal points, national reports and strategies. InforMEA also provides access to 28 free online e-learning courses related to the MEA's, which are used in University curriculum including that of Macquarie University in Sydney, the University of Eastern Finland and the UN system staff college (UNSSC).

The InforMEA Initiative consists of 20 Multilateral Environmental Agreements hosted with four United Nations bodies. MEAs include Basel, Rotterdam, Stockholm and Minamata (Chemicals and Wastes); CBD(Biodiversity); CITES (Trade in Wildlife); ITPR-FA (Plants); Vienna (Ozone); Ramsar (Wetlands); UNESCO-WHC (World Heritage); UNCCD (Deserts); UNFCCC (Climate Change); 5 UNECE Conventions and a number of regional conventions.
