= Environmental issues in Canada =

Environmental issues in Canada include impacts of climate change, air and water pollution, mining, logging, and the degradation of natural habitats. As one of the world's significant emitters of greenhouse gasses, Canada has the potential to make contributions to curbing climate change with its environmental policies and conservation efforts.

== Climate change ==
Among countries that emit high levels of greenhouse gas, Canada is among the highest per person emitters.

CO_{2} emissions in Canada, 1785-2022

Climate change is greatly impacting Canada's environment and landscapes. Extreme weather has become more frequent and severe because of the continued release of greenhouse gases into the atmosphere. The number of climate change–related events, such as the 2021 British Columbia Floods and an increasing number of forest fires, has become an increasing concern over time. Canada's annual average temperature over land warmed by 1.7 °C (3.1 °F) between 1948 and 2016. The rate of warming is highest in Canada's north, the Prairies, and northern British Columbia. The country's precipitation has increased in recent years and wildfires expanded from seasonal events to year-round threats.

As of 2022, Canada was the world's 11th highest emitter of carbon dioxide (CO_{2}) and as of 2021 the 7th highest emitter of greenhouse gases. Canada has a long history of producing industrial emissions going back to the late 19th century. In 2022 transport, oil and gas extraction, and fugitive emissions together emitted 82% of the country's total emissions. From 1990 to 2022, GHG emissions from conventional oil production increased by 24%, those from multi-stage fracturing techniques increased by 56%, and emissions from oil sands production increased by 467%. This has led to criticism against Canada for committing to reducing greenhouse emissions while supporting its oil and gas industry.

Canada committed to reducing its greenhouse gas (GHG) emissions by 30% below 2005 levels by 2030 under the Paris Agreement. In July 2021, Canada enhanced the Paris Agreement plans with a new goal of reducing emissions by 40–45% below 2005 levels by 2030, enacting the Canadian Net-Zero Emissions Accountability Act. In 2019, the House of Commons voted to declare a national climate emergency in Canada. Several climate change mitigation policies have been implemented in the country, such as carbon pricing, emissions trading and climate change funding programs.

=== Arctic melting ===
Scientists across the world have already started to notice massive reductions in Canada's Arctic sea ice cover, particularly during the summertime. The shrinking of this ice results in the disruption of the ocean circulation, and changes in climate and weather around the world. The 2019 Canada's Changing Climate Report, written by scientists from institutions around the globe, states that the impacts of climate change on Atlantic Canada will be very diverse. One impact is that the sea ice will become thinner and will also form for much shorter periods of the year. And with less sea ice than the region usually gets now, wave seasons will become more intense. Atlantic Canada will see a relative rise in sea levels everywhere - a rise which is estimated to be 75 to 100-cm by the year 2100. Scientists also predict that even if emissions decrease, a 20-cm rise is expected to take place during the course of the next 20 to 30 years. NASA studies have also found that a major ocean current in the Arctic has become faster and more turbulent due to the rapid ice melt, disrupting the delicate balance of the Arctic environment with an influx of freshwater. As the ocean warms and subtropical waters move north, the ocean will become warmer and saltier, and since warmer water holds less oxygen than cooler water, marine ecosystems can suffer and become less sustainable because of this lower oxygen level. In the journal, Science, which was published in March 2019, it explains that warmer waters could actually increase fish stocks in certain regions, like the halibut found off the coast of Newfoundland and Greenland but other species such as the Atlantic Cod and albacore tuna might not be able to cope with the conditions so well.

=== Wildfires ===
Wildfires are a major concern in Canada, with an average of over 7,000 wildfires occurring each year in Canada. Since 1990, these fires across Canada have consumed approximately an average of 2.5 million hectares a year. Wildfires are a recurrent natural disaster in Canada, escalating due to climate change and other human-induced factors. The situation has worsened over the years, with 2023 marking a particularly devastating wildfire season. The wildfires led to massive evacuations, with tens of thousands of people displaced from their homes. In British Columbia, about 35,000 individuals were under evacuation orders, and over 30,000 were on evacuation alert due to the intensifying fires. The wildfires also caused substantial property and infrastructure damage, destroying nearly 200 homes and structures in Kelowna, BC. The Canadian federal government, along with provincial authorities, initiated several measures to combat the fires and mitigate their impacts. This included deploying the military to affected regions, imposing travel restrictions, and soliciting international assistance.

=== Pipelines ===
The environmental issue of pipelines in Canada is a complex and multi-faceted concern, encompassing potential impacts on both natural ecosystems and human communities. Public opinion in Canada reflects a significant opposition towards government financial involvement in oil pipelines. Many Canadians opposed a multibillion-dollar writedown on the Trans Mountain oil pipeline by the federal government. Additionally, Canadian governments have provided over CAD 23 billion to oil and gas pipelines in the last few years. This financial support was aimed at boosting the economy, but critics often argue it undermines Canada's green recovery efforts by potentially increasing carbon emissions. Economically, the new pipeline still serves as a strong case, helping open up newer markets for Canadian producers.

The Canadian Energy Regulator controls about 10% (73,000 km) of the pipelines in Canada, their Pipeline Safety Act, as a regulatory response, aims to mitigate several risks by enhancing pipeline operating safety and environmental protection measures. From a technical perspective, corrosion, construction defects, and cracking are generally the most commonly identified leading causes of pipeline leaks in Canada, emphasizing the need for robust maintenance and safety protocols. Additionally, there are measures in place for preventing and responding to marine oil spills, including using satellite technology for detection and surveillance and advancing science to improve cleanup technologies.

== Species conservation ==
=== Endangered species and biodiversity ===
Species biodiversity and wildlife population numbers have been declining in Canada for decades. According to the most recent Living Planet Report Canada, species that are deemed at-risk of extinction have experienced an average population decline of 59% compared to 1970. Today, there are more than 600 plant and animal species throughout Canada that are listed on the Federal Species at Risk Act. This federal act utilizes a variety of measures to protect wildlife species that have been deemed endangered species or are at risk of becoming endangered. These measures are designed to encourage engagement and cooperation between individual citizens, local governments, and Aboriginal peoples.

=== Shipping vs. orcas ===
There are hundreds of different species that are at risk throughout Canada, but a few of them are particularly noteworthy. The Southern Resident Killer Whale, commonly referred to as the Orca Whale, is an apex predator in coastal regions off the West Coast of Canada and the United States. These whales play a vital role in maintaining the resiliency and health of the ecosystems that they are a part of. Despite their importance, this species continues to face an increasing number of threats. Some of the most pressing threats are the result of habitat disturbance from human activity. The underwater noise that marine vessels produce interferes with the Orcas echolocation abilities, impacting their ability to locate food. Shipping activities also impact Orca whales in other ways including oil spills, ship strikes, and pollution. As a result of these threats, the current population of this species is estimated to be 71 in total. Their preservation is very important to marine health in the regions that they inhabit.

=== Polar bear ===
Another important endangered species to highlight is the polar bear. Two-thirds of the world's polar bears live on Canadian portions of the Arctic. Polar Bears are another apex predator that serve as an important indicator for the health of the ecosystems that they are a part of. The greatest threat to this species is the loss of their primary habitat- sea ice. Sea ice is where Polar Bears raise their cubs, and it is also the habitat for their primary food source, ringed seals. As climate change causes sea ice to melt, Polar Bears population numbers have fallen dramatically, making this species a direct indicator for the effects of climate change on the region. Right now, there are estimated to be around 16,000 Polar Bears throughout Canada.

== Resource conservation ==
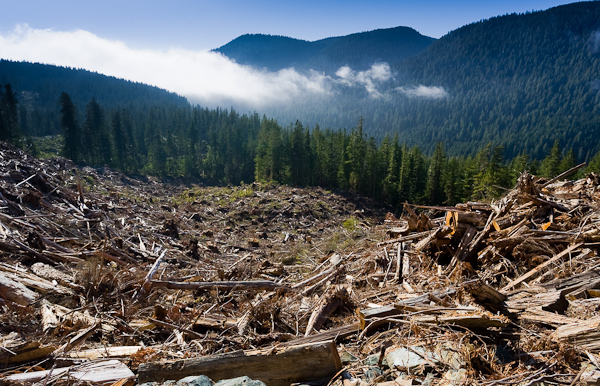
Clearcutting of old-growth forests just outside Carmanah Walbran Provincial Park in British Columbia

The Rainforest Action Network and indigenous groups have campaigned to protect the boreal forest of Canada from logging and mining. In July 2008 the Ontario government announced plans to protect some of the area from all industrial activity.

=== Logging ===
In 2021, the logging industry accounted for around 20 megatonnes—more than that of electricity production or emissions from Canada's Tar Sands. When it comes to the logging industry, the Canadian Government has failed to report accurate greenhouse gas emissions (GHG), absolving the logging industry from taking accountability for its contribution to GHG. Every year, the logging industry cuts down around half a million hectares of forest in Canada. It is responsible for over 10% of the country's total greenhouse gas emissions. The Canadian logging industry says its practices are sustainable and better than other countries. Critics say the current clearcutting and replanting methods contribute to significant forest loss and biodiversity decline, along with releasing carbon into the atmosphere.

The industry minimizes its role in environmental issues by deflecting responsibility on “naturally occurring phenomena” when it comes to fires and forest loss. Spreading misinformation has influenced logging policies in Canada, prioritizing short-term profits over environmental protection. This has led to the neglect of necessary safeguards, such as boreal caribou habitat protections and environmental erosion regulations. Ignoring its adverse effects on forests, communities, and the climate has enabled the Canadian government and logging companies to continue to widen the gap in creating a climate safe sector of logging.

== Mining ==
=== Abandoned fossil fuel wells ===
According to the Alberta Energy Regulator (AER), approximately 170,000 wells have been abandoned in Alberta, Canada. These “orphaned” wells pose threats for the surrounding communities and environment. Inactive wells pose a significant risk the longer they remain unplugged. When the hazardous materials from these wells are not properly managed, it can lead to the leaking of countless chemical toxins. Methane is a colorless, odorless gas that has tremendously more heat trapping abilities than carbon dioxide, and because of its makeup, methane can go undetected for years. The Wilderness Society also states that this leads to countless negative health impacts including, but not limited to, cancer, premature birth, and asthma. On top of that, the other undetectable toxins being released from orphaned wells gradually poison wldlife habitats, along with air and water.

Typically companies must follow Alberta's Environmental Protection and Enhancement Act (EPEA) requirements for these abandoned sites. The process of reclaiming these sites requires specific criteria starting with a comprehensive site assessment determining the extent of contamination and the potential environmental risks. From there, these sites must create a reclamation plan outlining strategies for returning the abandoned site to a useful and safe condition. Based on the scale of the project, there must be approvals to ensure the reclamation work complies with relevant laws and standards.

The EPEA has a specific set of requirements for the cleanup of contaminated sites, which often requires ongoing monitoring and reporting to ensure that the reclamation plans are being met. These projects are tedious and can take years or decades to complete. As of 2020, Canada's Office of the Parliamentary Budget Officer (PBO) estimated these orphan well-clean up projects at costing around $361 million. By 2025, the clean-up process is estimated to reach around $1.1billion.

== Pollution ==
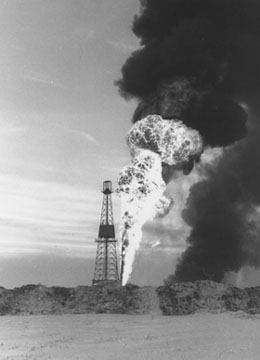
Leduc oil

Pollution in Canada refers to the introduction of contaminants into the natural environment, including air, water, and soil systems. It is recognized in scientific literature and government policy as a significant environmental and public health issue, and associated with industrial activity, transportation emissions, agricultural runoff, resource extraction (notably mining, oil and gas development), and urban development.

Air pollution
primarily associated with greenhouse gas emissions, particulate matter, nitrogen oxides, and ground-level ozone, largely produced by transportation, industry, and energy production. While air quality has improved in many regions due to regulatory measures, certain urban and industrial areas continue to experience elevated pollution levels, with documented associations to respiratory and cardiovascular health effects.

Water pollution
historically been linked to industrial waste, agricultural runoff, inadequate wastewater treatment in some regions, and contamination of freshwater ecosystems. Although Canada has extensive freshwater resources and regulatory frameworks intended to protect water quality, localized issues persist, including nutrient loading, toxic waste, and advisories affecting drinking water in some Indigenous and rural communities.

Soil contamination
occurs in areas affected by industrial activity, waste disposal, mining, and the use of agricultural chemicals. Remediation efforts are ongoing at contaminated sites across the country, particularly in former industrial zones and resource extraction regions.

Pollution contributes to broader policy debates on economic development, resource extraction, and environmental protection, with public concern linked to its health impacts, environmental degradation, and effects on biodiversity. Environmental policy in Canada also increasingly incorporates climate change mitigation and sustainable development goals, while regulation is addressed through a combination of federal legislation, such as the Canadian Environmental Protection Act, provincial environmental regulations, and municipal bylaws.

=== Air pollution ===
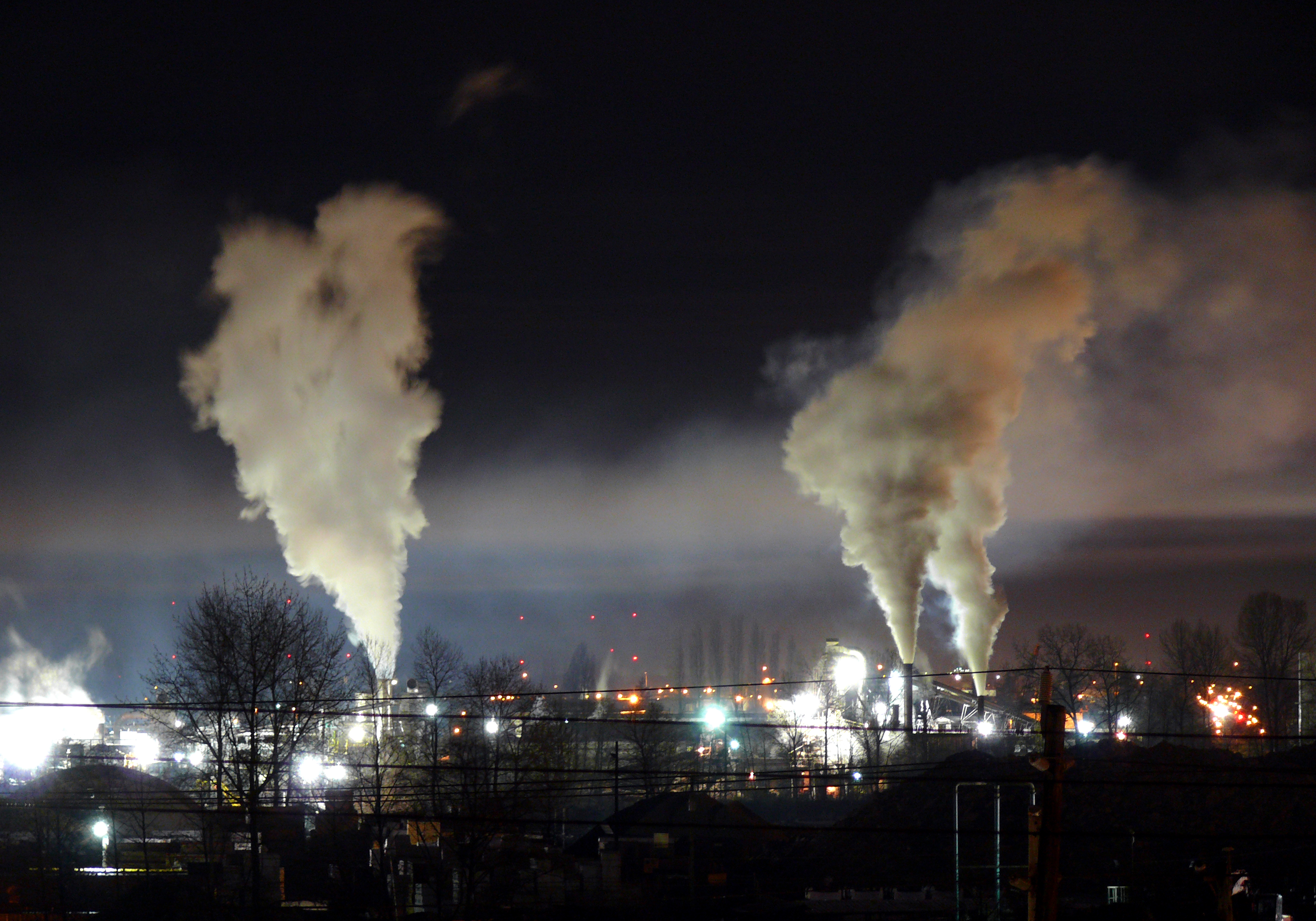
Industry is a significant source of air pollution in Canada.

Air pollution is the release of pollutants (a substance or energy introduced into the environment that has undesired effects) into the air that are detrimental to human health and the Earth. In Canada, air pollution is regulated by standards set by the Canadian Council of Ministers of the Environment (CCME), an inter-governmental body of federal, provincial and territorial Ministers responsible for the environment. Air pollution from the United States and to lesser extent Canada; caused by metal smelting, coal-burning for utilities, and vehicle emissions has resulted in acid rain, has severely impacted Canadian waterways, forest growth, and agricultural productivity.

Pollution reduces the value of the assets that make up Canadians' wealth. Properties are less valuable when they are polluted. It is estimated that pollution costs Canada tens of billions of dollars every year. Transportation is one of the main sources of air pollution and greenhouse gas emissions in Canada and are responsible for more than a quarter of all greenhouse gases and air pollutants in Canada. Pollutants' concentrations in the air can be influenced by many factors, such as the number of air pollutants, proximity to sources, and weather conditions. Canada's population and economy growth increases the demand for the production and supply of services, transportation and housing. The energy required to meet such demands comes partially from fossil fuels, which affects air quality. The growing demand for Canadian exports, such as the oil and gas industry, also generates the release of air pollutants.

=== Chemical pollution ===
The Aamjiwnaang First Nation community has expressed concern regarding its proximity to chemical plants, as birth rates of their people have been documented by the American journal Environmental Health Perspectives as deviating from the normal ratio of close to 50% boys, 50% girls. The ratio as found between 1999 and 2003 by the journal was roughly 33% boys, and 67% girls. The First Nation is concerned that this abnormal trend is due to adverse effects of maternal and fetal exposure to the effluent and emissions of the nearby chemical plants. This is the first community in the world to have a birth rate of two girls to every boy.

=== Mining pollution ===
Canada, like other countries with extensive mining operations, has significant environmental issues, including:

- Environmental impact of the Athabasca oil sands
- Cleanup of the Colomac Mine
- Acid mine drainage from the Northland Pyrite Mine
- Mary River Mine environmental concerns

=== Plastic pollution ===
In the year 2022 Canada announced a ban on producing and importing single use plastic from December 2022. The sale of those items will be banned from December 2023 and the export from 2025. The prime minister of Canada Justin Trudeau pledged to ban single use plastic in 2019. As for now in Canada "Up to 15 billion plastic checkout bags are used each year and approximately 16 million straws are used every day"

=== Tar sands ===
Tar sands can be described as areas on land containing an unconventional mixture of sand, clay, water, and a petroleum based residue called bitumen, that is useful to produce crude oil. In the NDRC article it mentions that Canada is currently one of the largest depositors of crude oil in the world. The development of tar sands requires extensive infrastructure, such as roads and pipelines. Canada's oil and gas sector, primarily driven by tar sands, contributes 26% of the country's greenhouse gas emissions. Tar sands production has surged by 456% between 1990 and 2018, resulting in a carbon footprint larger than that of New Zealand and Kenya combined. This expansion has led to the clearance or degradation of millions of acres of the Boreal Forests, endangering vital habitats for wildlife. The Boreal Forests serve as a massive carbon sink, however with these areas rapidly being destroyed there are even more concerns around air pollution and water contamination. Additionally, these extraction sites violate Indigenous rights as tar sands encroach on traditional lands, causing environmental contamination and health issues.

Refining of tar sands produces air pollutants, including sulfur dioxide and nitrogen oxides, which can have adverse effects on air quality and human health. This process produces three times more carbon emissions compared to the production of conventional crude. According to another NDRC article, mining operations require flattening the forests in order to access the tar sands. Extraction requires a substantial amount of water, which also contaminates local water sources and disrupts aquatic ecosystems. Leftover waste from tar sands processing, known as tailings, is stored in large ponds. These ponds pose a risk of leakage, which can contaminate nearby water sources and harm aquatic life. While around 150 Nations have signed a Treaty against Tar Sands Expansion, Canadian governments continue to support these projects, posing a threat to Indigenous lands and the environment.

Also taking a look at oil sands, methane projections from Canada's oil sands tailings using scientific deep learning reveal significant underestimation.

== Population ==
=== Economy of Alberta ===
Alberta's economy, notably its substantial fossil fuel industry, poses significant environmental challenges, making it a crucial topic for discussing environmental issues in Canada. The extraction of non-conventional oil from the oil sands is particularly impactful, contributing to greenhouse gas emissions, water and air pollution, and land disturbance. Despite this, Alberta is striving to mitigate environmental impacts by diversifying its economic sectors. The province's efforts to transition towards a more sustainable economic model, balancing economic growth with environmental stewardship, encapsulate broader environmental endeavors within Canada, portraying a microcosm of the challenges and actions toward sustainability.

=== Indigenous rights and land use ===
According to the 2021 Canadian Census, over 1.8 million people self-identified as Indigenous. Despite this demographic accounting for only 5.0% of the total population, there has been a pattern where most of the toxic, polluting industries and corporations are located directly adjacent to indigenous communities. This has placed a disproportionately high environmental burden on these communities, exposing indigenous peoples to the health risks that are associated with these polluting facilities more so than other Canadian citizens. For example, there is a region colloquially referred to as ‘Chemical Valley’ which has the largest concentration of chemical plants and refineries in the entire country – and this region is directly bordering the Aamjiwnaang First Nation, an indigenous community in Sarnia, Ontario. Members of this community believe that the air, water, and soil pollution from these chemical facilities has contributed to higher rates of asthma and cancer amongst its residents. In 2019, the United Nations Special Rapporteur on human rights and hazardous substances visited this region, and concluded that the Aamjiwnaang community, as well as other indigenous communities throughout Canada, are in fact disproportionately affected by toxic waste compared to other demographic groups. In response to this situation, some grassroots groups and movements have been formed in order to fight to change this imbalance. For example, ‘Land Back’ is an Indigenous-led movement that leads protests and demonstrations. Their goal is to help influence policy changes that would reclaim land for indigenous groups, allowing them to have control over how that land is used, extracted, and polluted.

== See also ==
- Environment of Canada
- Environmental policy of the Harper government
- History of Canada
- Environmental history of the United States
- Environmental racism
- Water pollution in Canada
- Hard Choices: Climate Change in Canada
- List of environmental issues
- Pollution in Canada
- RAVEN (Respecting Aboriginal Values & Environmental Needs)
- Carbon pricing in Canada
- 2023 Canadian wildfires
- Pipelines in Canada
