= Sustainable Development Strategy in Canada =

Sustainable Development in Canada

Sustainable Development Strategy for organizations in Canada is about the Government of Canada finding ways to develop social, financial, and environmental resources that meet the needs of the present without compromising the ability of future generations to meet their own needs in the country. A Sustainable Development Strategy for the organization needs to be developed that establishes the Sustainable Development goals and objectives set by the Auditor General Act of Canada and provides the written policies and procedures to achieve them. Sustainable Development is based on responsible decision-making, which considers not only the economic benefits of development, but also the short-term and long-term, Canadian environment and environmental impacts.

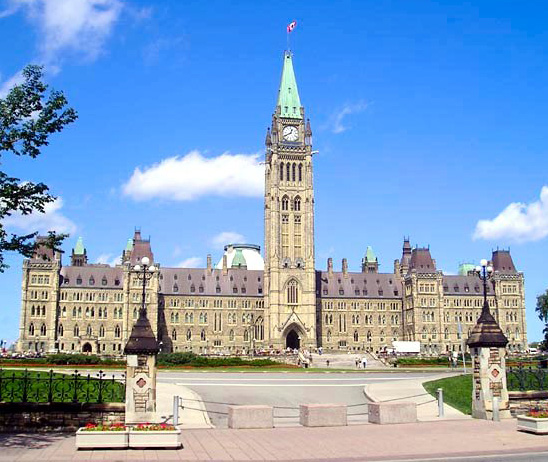
Parliament Hill

== Overview ==
All Canadians have a role to play in advancing Sustainable Development, including all levels of government, business and industry, civil society, community groups and citizens. The importance of developing a balance between economic growth, social well-being, and the health of the environment is at the forefront of public opinion. Canadians realize that a healthy environment is imperative for our long-term economic, social well-being and quality of life. The organization must have the ability to adopt innovative environmental practices and reduce their ecological footprint. The organization must develop a sustainable future through various strategies, policies, programs, and operations. A key pillar of the organization's approach to Sustainable Development should be to establish a Sustainable Development Strategy. This strategy is an important tool to help guide the organization in systematically integrating the principles of Sustainable Development into their policies, programs, legislation, and operations.

== Auditor General Act ==
In 1995, the Auditor General Act was amended to encourage stronger Sustainable Development performance by the Federal Government of Canada.

== Mission statement ==
Sustainable Development is a key goal for public policy in Canada and should be made the foundation of the organization's approach to environmental management. This understanding should be reflected in the creation of a Mission Statement for the organization, which outlines its commitment to making Sustainable Development a reality in Canada.

== Environmental Management System (EMS) ==
The organization should implement an Environmental Management System (EMS). This systematic approach to dealing with the environmental aspects of an organization is a 'tool' that enables an organization to control the impact of its activities, products, and services on the natural environment. The ISO 14001 standard "Environmental management systems--Specification with guidance for use" is the standard within the ISO 14000 series that specifies the requirements of an EMS.

== Environmental Management System Manual (EMSM) ==
The creation of an Environmental Management System Manual (EMSM) is to provide the framework for the organization's EMS. It should identify the elements and procedures for all staff, relating to environmental management.

== Environmental Management System Documentation ==
The organization should establish and maintain information in paper or electronic form, to describe the core elements of the management system and their interaction and provide direction to related documentation.

== Environmental Management Program (EMP) ==
The organization requires an Environmental Management Program (EMP), which is developed for environmental aspects to map out the organization's course of action to reduce environmental impact and to turn words into actions. An EMP must describe how targets will be achieved; the performance measures used to report on progress; identify personnel responsible for achieving these targets; and establish time frames for achievement. Generally, an EMP lists what is to be done, how it is to be done, who is going to do it, and how long it is going to take. At the end of every fiscal year, the EMPs are reported on and updated for the next year. The development of an EMP is the key to fulfilling the organization's Sustainable Development strategy for developing and implementing an ISO comparable EMS. This initiative should include integrating environmental best practices into projects, programs, and processes, and strengthening existing environmental practices.

== Commitment to Sustainable Development ==
The organization should focus on four key goals:

- Reduce the effects of their operations on land, air, and water;
- Programs should demonstrate sustainable service delivery;
- All employees apply Sustainable Development in their jobs; and
- Employ modern systems that support and maintain Sustainable Development.

== Environment policy ==
The organization should define the organization's environmental policy and ensure that it is appropriate to the nature, scale, and environmental impacts of its activities, products, and services. That it includes a commitment to continual improvement and prevention of pollution. It provides a commitment to comply with relevant environmental legislation and regulations and with other requirements to which the organization subscribes. Create a framework for setting and reviewing environmental objectives and targets. A documented audit trail that reflects implementation and maintenance of the policy and have it communicated to all employees with availability to the public.

== Environmental aspects ==
The organization should establish and maintain procedures to identify the environmental aspects of its activities, products, and services that it can control and over which it can be expected to have an influence, in order to determine those, which have or can have significant impacts on the environment. The organization should ensure that the aspects related to these significant impacts are considered in setting its environmental objectives. The organization must keep this information up-to-date.

== Legal and other requirements ==
The organization should establish and maintain a procedure to identify and have access to legal and other requirements to which the organization subscribes, that are applicable to the environmental aspects of its activities, products or services and the relevant Acts.

== Environmental objectives and targets ==
The organization should establish and maintain documented environmental objectives and targets, at each relevant function and level within the organization. When establishing and reviewing its objectives, the organization must consider the legal and other requirements, its significant environmental aspects, its technological options and its financial, operational, and business requirements and views of interested parties. The objectives and targets should be consistent with the environmental policy, including the commitment to prevent pollution.

== Organizational structure and responsibility ==
The roles, responsibility and authorities should be defined, documented, and communicated in order to facilitate effective environmental management. The organization should provide resources essential to the implementation and control of the EMS. Resources available should include human resources with specialized skills, technology, and financial resources. The organization's top management should appoint specific management representatives who, irrespective of other responsibilities, have defined roles, responsibilities, and authority for:

- Ensuring that EMS requirements are established, implemented and maintained in accordance with this standard; and
- Reporting on the performance of the EMS to top management for review and as a basis for improvement of the EMS.

== Communication ==
With regard to its environmental aspects and environmental management system, the organization should establish and maintain procedures for internal communication between the various levels and functions of the organization and the receiving, documenting and responding to relevant communication from external interested parties. The organization should consider processes for external communication on its significant environmental aspects and record its decisions.

== Document control ==
Documentation should be legible, dated, and readily identifiable, maintained in an orderly manner, and retained for a specified period. Procedures and responsibilities should be established and maintained concerning the creation and modification of the various types of documents. The organization should establish and maintain procedures for controlling all documents required for their Sustainable Development as follows:

- They must be periodically reviewed, revised as necessary and approved for adequacy by authorized personnel;
- The current versions of relevant documents made available at all locations where operations essential to the effective functioning of the environmental management system are performed;
- Obsolete documents need to be promptly removed from all points of issue and points of use, or otherwise assured against unintended use; and
- The obsolete documents should be retained for legal and/or knowledge preservation purposes are suitably identified.

== Operational control ==
The organization should identify those operations and activities that are associated with the identified significant environmental aspects in line with its policy, objectives and targets. They should plan these activities, including maintenance, in order to ensure that they are carried out under specified conditions by:

- Establishing and maintaining documented procedures to cover situations where their absence could lead to deviations from the environmental policy and the objectives and targets;
- Stipulating operating criteria in the procedures; and
- Establishing and maintaining procedures related to the identifiable significant environmental aspects of goods and services used by the organization and communicating relevant procedures and requirements to suppliers and contractors.

== Emergency preparedness and response ==
The organization should establish and maintain procedures to identify the potential for and respond to environmental disasters, accidents and emergency situations and for preventing and mitigating the environmental impacts that may be associated with them. The organization should review and revise, where necessary, its emergency preparedness and response procedures, in particular, after the occurrence of accidents or emergency situations.

== Monitoring and measurement ==
The organization should establish and maintain documented procedures to monitor and measure, on a regular basis, the key characteristics of its operations and activities that can have a significant impact on the environment. This would entail a requirement to establish and maintain documented procedures for periodically evaluating compliance with relevant environmental legislation and regulations.

== Non-conformance and corrective and preventive action ==
The organization needs to establish and maintain procedures for identifying responsibility and authority for handling and investigating nonconformance, taking action to mitigate any environmental impacts caused and for initiating and completing corrective and preventative action.

== Records ==
Establish and maintain procedures for the identification, maintenance, and dispositions of environmental records. These records should include training records and the results of audits and reviews.

== Internal audit ==
The organization should establish and maintain programs and procedures for periodic EMS internal audits to be carried out, in order to determine whether or not the EMS functions according to policies and procedures and provide information on the results of audits to management. The internal audit program, including any schedule, should be based on the environmental importance of the activity concerned and the results of previous audits. In order to be comprehensive, the audit procedures should cover the audit scope, frequency, and methodologies, as well as the responsibilities and requirements for conducting audits and reporting results.

== Management review ==
Senior management should, at reasonable time intervals review the EMS, to ensure its continuing suitability, adequacy, and effectiveness. The management review process should ensure that the necessary information is collected to allow management to carry out this evaluation. This review should be documented. The management review should address the possible need for changes to policy, objectives and other elements of the environmental management system, in light of EMS audit results, changing circumstances and the commitments to continual improvement.

== Human resources ==
Sustainable human resources practices encourage working arrangements that support environmental objectives, the provision of environmental awareness into all training programs, and the promotion of environmental practices.

=== Training, awareness and competence ===
There is a requirement to identify training needs. It should require that all personnel, whose work may create a significant impact on the environment, have appropriate training. It should establish and maintain procedures to make its employees or members at each relevant function and level aware of:

- The importance of conformance with the environmental policy and procedures and with the requirements of the environmental management system;
- The significant environmental impacts, actual or potential, of their work activities and the environmental benefits of improved personal performance;
- Their roles and responsibilities in achieving conformance with the environmental policy and procedures and with the requirements of the environmental management system, including emergency preparedness and response requirements; and
- The potential consequences of departure from specified operating procedures.

Personnel performing the tasks which can cause significant environmental impacts should be competent on the basis of appropriate education, training and/or experience.

=== Managers ===
Managers need to be knowledgeable of Sustainable Development and the action plan commitments that encompass their office. Goal one should be a strategy to prepare managers to contribute to Sustainable Development. As the organization moves towards meeting commitments presented in this report, managers will be able to readily access resources to aid them. The integration of 'sustainable' thinking into existing management tools and processes and daily practices is an important component of Sustainable Development strategy. As a manager, they are responsible to enable their employees to contribute to Sustainable Development by providing them with information about the Sustainable Development and other resource information available to them. They should also be supporting employee initiatives to contribute to Sustainable Development, including actions such as recycling, green procurement of supplies, organizing 'green' meetings, and integrating Sustainable Development into their day-to-day activities.

== Action plan ==
The average federal employee generates 190 kilograms of solid non-hazardous waster per year. 74% is paper, including fine paper, low grade paper, paper towels, newsprint, coated paper and cardboard.

=== The 3Rs ===
To be effective, the organization has to incorporate waste minimisation with the waste hierarchy known as the 3Rs: (i) Reduce; (ii) Reuse; and (iii) Recycle into their daily routine.

Reduce

Reducing the amount of waste produced is by far the most effective way to battle the flow of garbage into the landfill. Reduce because what is not produced cannot pollute. Reducing consumption saves money and reduces pollution. There are many opportunities to reduce the amount of waste generated simply by changing individual habits and office procedures.

Reuse

Reuse means suitable to use again or for further use. It is the quality or state of being to be reusable. What cannot be reduced they should try to reuse. After a product or material has been used once, every effort should be made to reuse it. Products that can be reused should be favored over those that are non-reusable.

Recycling

Recycling is the process of returning to a previous stage of a cyclic process; converting waste into usable form; the ability to use again with little or no alteration. Once a product or its packaging has reached the end of its useful life and cannot be reused, it should be recycled. Recycling moderates demand for natural resources and it contributes positively to waste management by reducing the amount of waste destined for landfill.

=== Computer ===
Computer equipment includes desktop personal computers (PCs), laptops, monitors and peripherals: i.e., cables, printers, scanners, keyboards and speakers. In 1998, nearly 50% of households in Canada had computers and that number is steadily increasing. Due to technological innovations and market expansion of computer equipment and software, PCs are now becoming obsolete at increasing rates and are globally one of the fastest-growing components of municipal waste streams. The average first life, the amount of time the PC is useful to its original owner, is now 2–4 years. In the year 2005, a PC's first life was decreased by another year. Considering reuse and storage options, the total lifespan, the period from manufacture to disposal, of a PC is estimated at 3–6 years.

Some materials in computer equipment, such as heavy metals, including lead, mercury, hexavalent chromium, cadmium and brominated flame-retardants are highly toxic to the environment, wildlife and human health if mismanaged. InKind Canada donated 1092 used computers to charitable organizations in 1999 and reBOOT Canada, a non-profit charity in Toronto, resold 3000 computers in 1999. In addition, there is a program called "Computers for Schools" co-founded in 1993 by Industry Canada and the TelecomPioneers, refurbishes computers and related equipment donated by governments and businesses. These computers are distributed across Canada to schools, libraries and registered not-for-profit learning organizations.

Between 70-90% of the material in scrap computer equipment, by weight, is potentially recyclable or reusable. For instance, materials such as steel, aluminum, copper, glass and some plastics, can be recovered. Obsolete computer equipment that is properly pre-treated: i.e., toxic components removed, and disassembled can promote the conservation of natural resources and prevent hazardous substances from entering the environment.

=== Procurement ===
Greener procurement means choosing products and services that have less impact on the environment than their traditional counterparts. Greener procurement incorporates environmental considerations into decisions in addition to the conventional criteria of price and quality. In support of Sustainable Development the organization should develop and publish a 'Sustainable Development Procurement Guidelines and Procedures'. When it comes to purchasing products or services, referral to these guidelines would help make the organization become a leader in environmentally responsible purchasing.

Considerations for Sustainable Development purchasing are policies and procedures that incorporate the 3Rs when determining purchases.

- Reduce: Do I really need it? Can I reduce the quantity required?
- Reuse: Can I find a surplus item? Can I upgrade an existing item?
- Recycle: Can the products be recycled? Does it contain recycled material?

Bear in mind that while recycling is good, a reduction is best. The ultimate green procurement is the avoidance of the purchase altogether. However, we recommend: Buy efficient products; Reduce packaging waste; Consolidate service contracts; and Overcome cost barriers.

== Identifying environmentally preferable products and services ==
- Life Cycle Management (LCM): LCM is a process for evaluating the effects that a product has on the environment over its entire life span.
- Environmental Choice Program: An Environment Canada program designed to help consumers choose greener products and services. If the product/service meets the established criteria, in addition to meeting or exceeding any applicable safety and performance standards, the company may then use the EcoLogoTM in their marketing and promotional campaigns.
- EnerGuide: This is the official Government of Canada mark associated with the labeling and rating of the energy consumption or energy efficiency of specific products. EnerGuideTM labeling exists for appliances, heating and cooling equipment, houses and vehicles.
- Energy Star: Energy Star is an international symbol that identifies products that are the most energy-efficient on the market. In Canada, Energy Star includes several product categories: office equipment; appliances; heating, ventilating and cooling equipment; consumer electronics; lighting; signage and commercial and industrial equipment.

== Traveling ==
The organization should encourage all business travelers to choose accommodations that are environmentally preferable. The PWGSC Accommodation and Car Rental Directory, includes two distinct environmental certification ratings to help make informed choices based not only on price and location but also on environmental ratings. The Directory displays the Green Leaf and Green Key ratings, which are attributed to establishments by Terra Choice Environmental Services Inc. or the Hotel Association Canada respectively.

== Rechargeable batteries ==
Ongoing technological advances in rechargeable batteries and battery chargers, means most single-use alkaline batteries can largely be replaced with higher capacity, environmentally preferable, rechargeable Nickel-Metal Hydride (NiMH) batteries. Rechargeable batteries will outperform the best alkaline single-use batteries in high-drain appliances such as digital cameras. Rechargeable batteries may not last as long as alkaline batteries on a single charge in low drain (e.g. radio), medium drain (e.g. MD player), and pulse drain devices (e.g. photoflash); but NiMH batteries can be reused over several hundred times while alkaline batteries can be used only once. NiMH rechargeable batteries do not have what is commonly referred to as 'memory effect' so they can be recharged at any time. The main environmental concerns of batteries are the harmful materials they contain, such as Mercury (Hg), Cadmium (Cd) and Lead (Pb). Batteries containing these materials need to be carefully disposed of to avoid the harmful effects on human health and the environment. Canadians buy over 150 million batteries per year. It takes less energy to recharge a battery than to produce a new one. Using metal recovered from batteries consumes 75 percent less energy and 46 percent less energy than extracting it from primary sources.

== Fleet management ==
The subject of sustainable transportation has several areas to review.

=== Fuels ===
Alternative fuel cars can save the organization significant funds, there are several different fuel types available.

- Ethanol: Normally blended with conventional gasoline, ethanol reduces the amount of greenhouse gases your car emits by up to 10%.
- Natural Gas: burns more cleanly, efficiently, and completely than gasoline or diesel fuel, producing far fewer toxic pollutants and greenhouse gas emissions that contribute to climate change.
- Autogas (aka LPG, propane) : has extremely low sulphur content and therefore contributes very little to acid rain.

=== Operating a vehicle ===
Fuel efficient operation of vehicle.

- Leave the car at home;
- Use Alternative Fuels;
- Keep to the speed limit;
- Plan your travel; and
- Stop idling.

=== Maintenance ===
Ensure proper maintenance of vehicles.

- Maintaining the vehicle according to the manufacturer's recommended schedule;
- Keeping records of the preventive maintenance that is done;
- Having the exhaust system inspected regularly;
- Having older vehicles tuned up as required;
- Maintaining and reviewing fuel-consumption records; and
- Inspecting regularly for leaks.

== Energy conservation ==
Facilities that are energy efficient are important, besides being good for the environment, they keep workplaces healthy, boost productivity and save money. An energy-efficient design for a new building or an energy retrofit of an existing building can substantially reduce the building's operating costs.

== Water usage ==
Using water wisely will extend the life of our existing water supplies and their delivery systems, ultimately lowering water costs and the environmental burden of water usage. As a best practice, Health Canada recommends that water used for drinking and cooking be taken from the cold-water tap after the water has been 'run' until cold.

Checklist for Using Water More Efficiently

- Install low flow toilets, faucets, and showerheads or retrofit old devices;
- Avoid flushing the toilet unnecessarily or using the toilet as a garbage can;
- Fix any leaking or dripping faucets or showerheads;
- Choose to have a short shower using a low-flow showerhead instead of taking a bath;
- Maintain the manufacturer's specified temperature for your hot water tank;
- Keep a bottle of water in the refrigerator to avoid faucet run time;
- If water faucets must be run to obtain cold or hot water, catch the residual water in a container to use for cleaning, gardening, etc.;
- Use rain barrels to catch rainwater for gardening;
- Water lawns and gardens at night when evaporation is low and usage is not during the utility peak demand time;
- While brushing your teeth, turn the faucet off or fill a cup to rinse your mouth;
- While washing dishes, turn the faucet off between rinsing dishes; and

These measures may reduce water and energy consumption and associated costs.

== Paper initiatives ==
A paper save program should be initiated. The program should involve supplying paper recycling receptacles and side-bins to participating office buildings for the separation and collection of office paper products as well as setting up a collection system for larger corrugated cardboard boxes. The collected paper and cardboard should be picked up, separated, and weighed by the contracted recycling company and then sold on the recycled paper market. Revenues generated from the sale of the collected paper would cover the costs of the program and surplus funds are paid out to the program participants as rebates using a formula based on population information supplied by the Treasury Board Secretariat. The information would be collected from the PWGSC website, then tabulate and summarize the collected data for all organization buildings broken down to low-grade mix, cardboard, and office ledger. At the end of the year, a calculation of how many trees have been diverted from the pulp and paper mills using a Paper to Tree calculator should be used. A 2nd Life Program should be developed in order to maximize the use of paper and decrease the organization's paper burden. This program would turn collected one-sided paper into notebooks and pads. This best practice and responsible stewardship initiative is simple, environmentally friendly and cost-effective.

=== Checklist most efficient use of paper ===
- Mandatory double-sided photocopying;
- Mandatory double-sided printing;
- Documents formatted for efficient paper use (taking into account readability): smaller font size, minimum margins, minimum white space;
- All staff should know how to operate the photocopier correctly, and photocopier is well-maintained to avoid mistakes that waste paper;
- Paper use is minimized through the use of e-mail, electronic faxing, use of voicemail instead of paper memos, etc.;
- Paper documents are produced only when necessary and are as short as possible. Editing is done on-screen, rather than printing unnecessary drafts;
- Paper that has been used on one side only is collected and reused for fax cover sheets and note paper. Draft print-outs and photocopies for internal use are made on the back of used paper;
- Documents are circulated and memos posted rather than individual copies being distributed;
- Paper products have certified recycled content, with a high proportion of post-consumer content. Chlorine-bleached paper is avoided wherever possible;
- Paper products used are recyclable (e.g., no carbons);
- Fax paper use is minimized through brief cover sheets (partial page); no cover sheet; reusable cover sheets;
- In purchasing, priority is given to photocopiers and laser printers with duplex capability and to plain-paper fax machines. Preference is given to equipment capable of using unbleached paper with up to 100% post-consumer recycled content. Computers with built-in-fax-modems are preferred to enable electronic faxing;
- Mailing and circulation lists are regularly checked and updated to avoid unnecessary mailings; and
- Post-cards are used where possible for mail-outs, rather than separate sheets of paper and envelopes.

== General office practices ==
The office of the future or paperless office has more become more achievable in modern times.

=== Checklist for general office practices ===
- Turn off lights when not in use;
- Turn off personal computers if not in use for 2 hours or more. Shared office equipment, including printers and photocopiers should be turned off at the end of the day;
- Preference is given to reusable products (e.g., rechargeable batteries);
- File folders and envelopes are reused (e.g., by placing a label (water-based glue) over the old address);
- There is a central area where co-workers can bring unwanted office supplies, cardboard boxes, etc. for reuse by others. Plastic cerlox bindings, bingers, etc. are returned to a print shop for reuse;
- Management works with property management to establish recycling programs for waste materials, such as paper, glass, metals, and plastics. Recycling programs are well communicated and participation encouraged;
- Photocopier and laser printer toner cartridges, and printer ribbons, are recycled;
- Where possible, spent batteries from laptop computers are returned to the supplier for recycling;
- Disposable dishes, cutlery, straws, stir-sticks, napkins are not used for coffee breaks or meals; *Durable coffee mugs are used, and extras kept on hand for visitors;
- Coffee, cream and sugar etc. are purchased in bulk, and single-serve containers are not used;
- Coffee filters are reusable cloth or steel or unbleached recycled paper;
- Energy-efficiency is considered when purchasing new equipment. Preference is given to photocopiers with stand-by or sleep features and computers equipped with energy-saving features;
- Employees are encouraged to turn off taps securely, and promptly report dripping taps or other plumbing leaks to maintenance personnel;
- Exchange your used paperbacks, magazines and newspapers with colleagues;
- Business travel is minimized through the use of teleconferencing; and
- Employees are encouraged to walk, bicycle, carpool or use public transit as a mode of transportation to and from work as well as to attend meetings and events.

=== Checklist for meetings ===
For many organizations, sustainable development is a goal that impacts on all of their activities. The checklist is designed to help meeting organizers plan and implement meetings that are as environmentally responsible as possible.

- All promotional material is kept short and to the point;
- All documents are printed on recycled paper;
- The registration form is on only 1/2 or 1/3 of a page;
- It may be printed with the letter of introduction and cut or torn-off for mailing;
- Registration is confirmed by phone or electronically rather than by fax;
- Exhibitors, presenters, and participants are advised in advance that the conference will be "green";
- Participants are asked to bring their own paper and writing instruments (additional pens and paper are provided on-site for those who forget);
- The registration package is distributed at the event rather than mailed out. The program and other registration materials are informative but concise. Tourist information is available on request;
- The registration package is provided in a reusable holder - perhaps a durable binder or folder made from recycled plastic or paper, or a reusable cotton shopping bag; and
- Reusable plastic name cardholders with paper inserts are used and participants are asked to return them at the end of the sessions. Receptacles are provided at convenient spots such as hotel check-out, registration desk or outside the final meeting room.

=== Checklist exhibits and presentations ===
- Signage is durable, generic and undated so that it can be reused;
- Prominent, well-signed recycling bins for waste paper are placed in convenient locations throughout the conference area. Separate bins for newspaper recycling provided;
- Exhibit components are reusable and perhaps even made from used or recycled material.
- Exhibitors are asked to use recycled and recyclable handouts;
- As part of session introductions or wrap-ups, attendees are reminded of the recycling and waste reduction opportunities;
- Recycling bins are numerous, conveniently located, and well-marked;
- Presenters use 35mm slides or overheads rather than paper flip charts (consider drymark erasable boards or blackboards if needed);
- Distribution of brochures, handouts and session notes is limited to those with a genuine need or interest;
- A sign-up sheet is provided, or business cards are collected for subsequent mailings;
- Copies of session notes may be placed at the front of the room, rather than near the door; and
- All gifts and prizes are in keeping with the "green" theme - practical gift certificates, durable items made from recycled materials, donations to environmental organizations, unbleached cotton T-shirts or shopping bags, books etc..

=== Checklist of food and beverages ===
- All tableware is reusable, including coffee mugs, water glasses, cutlery, dishes, and cloth napkins and tablecloths;
- Water and juice are served in pitchers. Soft drinks are served in returnable bottles. Straws are not provided;
- Cream and milk are provided in jugs. Sugar is provided in bulk dispensers with lids, or loose or cubed in bowls and teaspoons are provided for stirring beverages;
- Condiments, spreads, and jams are served in bowls or jars rather than in individually wrapped servings; and
- Bulk coffee is used instead of single packets to reduce packaging waste; and
- Food leftovers are donated to a food bank or local charitable organization. Organic foods are composted.

== Key success factors ==
The organization should take note of five 'key success factors' and attempt to contribute to them in some of the following ways:

- i. Sustaining natural resources - sustainable jobs, communities, and industries.
- ii. Protecting the health of Canadians and of ecosystems.
- iii. Meeting international obligations.
- iv. Promoting equity.
- v. Improving our quality of life and well-being.

== Public relations ==
Sustainable Development makes for good public relations and international relations. The organization can help its clients and other stakeholders reduce the economic and environmental costs of doing business. Examples would be to increase electronic options and reducing the amount of paper which is consumed in transferring information from one source to another.

== Action plan ==
=== Short-term ===
- Broad-Based Commitment - strategies should indicate how Sustainable Development will be integrated into policies, programs, and operations;
- Skills and Understanding - efforts would be required to build the skills and understanding necessary for Sustainable Development planning and decision-making;
- Management Tools Development - environmental assessment, environmental auditing, accountability frameworks and performance contracting are important management tools which can help foster Sustainable Development; and
- Continuous Learning and Improvement - managing Sustainable Development would require continuous learning and improvement.

=== Long-term ===
Achieving Sustainable Development will involve significant changes in the way the organization thinks about and implements policy and procedures. It will require a long-term commitment and continuous effort. Organizations will need to continue to update their commitments every three years, in compliance with the amendments to the Auditor General Act.
