= International environmental agreement =

Treaties and protocols protecting the environment

An international environmental agreement or sometimes environmental protocol, is a type of treaty among countries seeking to reach an environmental goal. In other words, it is "an intergovernmental document intended as legally binding with a primary stated purpose of preventing or managing human impacts on natural resources."

An agreement between two nations is known as a bilateral environmental agreement. If the agreement is made among three or more nations, it is called a multilateral environmental agreement (MEA). Such agreements, primarily produced by the United Nations, cover subjects such as atmospheric policies, freshwater policies, hazardous waste and substance policies, the marine environment, nature conservation policies, noise pollution and nuclear safety.

== History and use ==
The use of multilateral environment agreements began in 1857, when a German agreement regulated the flow of water from Lake Constance to Austria and Switzerland. International environmental protocols came to feature in environmental governance after trans-boundary environmental problems became widely perceived in the 1960s.

Between 1857 and 2012, a total of 747 multilateral environmental agreements have been concluded. Following the Stockholm Intergovernmental Conference in 1972, creation of international environmental agreements proliferated. MEAs were popularized by the United Nations, the majority of MEAs have been implemented since the 1972 at the United Nations Conference on the Human Environment (also known as the Stockholm Conference). The Stockholm Declaration was adopted by all 113 countries in attendance at the conference, and was the first universal document of importance on an environmental issue.

A complex networking system is needed for a functional MEA system. Levels of government within a nation may impede each other about climate change (for example) due to opposing views or parties, making implementation more difficult and impacting external relationships. Interactions between MEAs can also influence each other positively or negatively, ultimately affecting their net effectiveness.

Policies surrounding an MEA are determined by the participating countries. The United Nations and the World Trade Organization are key intergovernmental organizations for forging and implementing the agreements.

There have been increasing use of environmental provisions in bilateral environmental agreements and also in international investment agreements, like bilateral environmental agreement.

== Effectiveness ==
Protocols can take flexible approaches to improve effectiveness. One example is the use of sanctions: under the Montreal Protocol, signatories were forbidden to purchase chlorofluorocarbons from non-signatories, in order to prevent any windfall benefits. Funding has also been used to overcome North-South conflict: members of the Montreal Protocol created a fund of $240 million to redistribute the costs of transition. It also has different ten-year grace period for developing countries. Differential obligations are also seen in the Kyoto Protocol and can encourage wider participation, where every country have very different targets mainly based on their development.

While protocols appear to be the ultimate top-down mode of governance, having "scant provisions for public participation," it is widely thought that the influence of transnational networks has been growing Public opinion is relevant, as concern must exist to prompt action and dedication of government resources. It kept growing more and more since the young activist Greta Thunberg started Fridays for Future. Non-governmental organizations also fulfill certain roles, from gathering information and devising policies to mobilizing support. Science plays an important part, although Susskind asserts that sometimes this role is diminished by uncertainty, disagreement, and the rise of "adversary science." The business community can also be involved with positive outcomes.

How we view the effectiveness of protocols depends on what we expect from them. With little administrative force or actual power, protocols succeed in increasing government concern, enhancing the contractual environment, and heightening capacity through transfer of assets. Yet as long as sovereignty is intact, environmental protocols will not affect changes in the face of state or public apathy, guarantee national action, or materialize overnight. The progress of international environmental law might be, as Wiener suggests, like the tortoise, slow but steady.

== Barriers and criticism ==
The world's existing political systems, differences and conflicts pose barriers to the creation of environmental protocols. First, maintenance of sovereignty means that no country can be forced to participate, only urged to do so. Consequently, as French states, "International law has the force of moral suasion, but few real teeth." Second, North-South conflict can block cooperation and cause conflicts. The countries in the global South, considered the poor one, generally see the countries of the North, the rich one, as needing to take responsibility for environmental degradation and make significant changes in their way of living, neither of which the North deems reasonable. The south argue that the north have already had the opportunity to develop and already polluted a lot during their industrial development.

Finally, countries may lack motivation to change their environmental policies due to conflict with other interests, especially economic prosperity. If environmental protocols will cause economic difficulties or harm to a country, it may shirk the protocols while other countries adhere to them, creating a classic free-rider problem. Additionally, environmental protocols may be criticized for scientific uncertainty, or at least a lack of synthesis of scientific information, which may be used for "blocking interests and doing mischief." In the case of problems like pollution and climate change, resistance typically is a product of engineered denial.

Due to these barriers, environmental protocols become an obvious target for several criticisms, such as being slow to produce the desired effects (due to the convention-protocol-ratification-implementation process), tending to the lowest common denominator, and lacking monitoring and enforcement. They can also be criticized for taking an incremental approach where sustainable development principles suggest that environmental concern should be mainstreamed.

== Intergovernmental organization involvement ==
=== United Nations ===
The United Nations is involved in MEAs worldwide on a number of issues, including biological diversity, chemicals and waste, and climate and the atmosphere. One example would be the Vienna Convention for the Protection of the Ozone Layer, which was brought together to address the hazardous effects of Chlorofluorocarbons on the atmosphere. The United Nations Information Portal (InforMEA) brings together MEAs by harvesting COP decisions and resolutions, news, events, MEA membership, national focal points, national reports and implementation plans from MEA secretariats and organizes this information around a set of agreed terms, for the benefit of Parties and the environment community at large

=== World Trade Organization ===
The World Trade Organization has been involved in MEA negotiations due to the agreements' trade implications. The organization has trade and environmental policies which promote the protection and preservation of the environment. Its objective is to reduce trade barriers and coordinate trade-related measures with environmental policies. Since MEAs protect and preserve the environment, they may help ease restrictions on trade. The WTO's principles are based on non-discrimination, free trade through reduction of trade barriers and fair competition, and MEAs have been rejected for not being in accordance with the organization's principles. The WTO is working with and implementing over 350 MEAs worldwide. Most of the agreements involve five core countries which are committed to environmental improvement and free trade. WTO members are legally bound to respect negotiated reductions of barriers to trade. However, conflict has arisen due to trade restriction.

== Major MEA participants ==
=== Australia ===
Australia is noted for its wide variety of animal species and diverse environment, which includes beaches, deserts and mountains, and climate change is a major concern. The country is under the largest ozone hole in the world, with environmental impact. Australia's proximity to Antarctica raises concerns about sea-level rise and changes in ocean currents which influence climate.

=== Canada ===
Canada's multilateral environmental agreements encompass air, biodiversity and ecosystems, chemicals and waste, climate change, environmental cooperation, marine and the oceans, and meteorology. Canada has taken an initiative due to the country's variety of natural resources, climates and populated areas, all of which can contribute to environmental stress. Relevant cases include Pakootas v. Teck Cominco Metals, in which the United States Supreme Court upheld a ruling of a lower court and charged a Canadian company, Teck Resources, for contaminating the Columbia River in the United States. Teck Resources smelter in Trail, British Columbia is upstream of the United States border.

=== United States ===
The United States has committed to the Montreal Protocol on Substances that Deplete the Ozone Layer, and global negotiations on mercury. The number of MEAs in which the U.S. is involved is substantially lower than Canada's, despite its greater population and larger carbon footprint and economy.

== See also ==
- Environmental law
- InforMEA
- International law
- List of international environmental agreements
