= Royal Commission on the Northern Environment =

Canadian land use and development commission

The Royal Commission on the Northern Environment was established by the Government of Ontario with J. E. J. Fahlgren as Commissioner. The final report and recommendations were submitted to the Ontario Ministry of the Attorney General on June 28, 1985.

== Overview ==
In 1976, the Ontario provincial government under then Conservative premier, Bill Davis, granted Reed Limited (Note: According to their McGill Digital Canadian Corporate Reports, Anglo-Canadian Pulp and Paper Mills, Ltd.—incorporated in Quebec in 1924—had acquired Dryden Paper Company, Limited in 1954. Reed Paper Ltd. then acquired Anglo-Canadian Pulp and Paper Mills which included Dryden Paper Company, Limited during 1974 and early 1975. In 1980, Reed Paper Ltd. was privatized and its name was changed to Reed Inc. in 1981.) the right to log nearly 50,000 square kilometres (19,000 sq mi) of boreal forest near the Grassy Lakes First Nation and the right to construct a second pulp and paper mill nearby, through a Memorandum of Understanding. This represented the "largest tract of forest land ever given to a single company". The MOU faced "public outcry" and had to be adandoned.

In response to public outrage on the land grant to a sole company, then Attorney General of Ontario Roy McMurtry on behalf of the Government of Ontario Government of Ontario under then premier, Bill Davis, launched the Royal Commission in 1977. The commission led by J.E.J. Fahlgren was launched in 1977 in response to Commissioners included arc S. Couse as executive director, Ian S. Fraser as director of research, Marlene Brushett as administrator, Lesley Andersen as office manager in Thunder Bay, C. Gaylord Watkins as counsel, and Roger Cotton as associate counsel. Fahlgren was a mine manager and community leader in Red Lake, Ontario.

Studies in the commissions investigation included "Tourism Development in Ontario North of 50°", "The Future of Mineral Development in the Province of Ontario - North of 50" with 13, accompanying technical papers", "The People of the North - In Quest of Understanding", "The Story of the Kiashke River Native Development Inc.", "North of 50°: An Atlas of Far Northern Ontario", and "The Kayahna Region Land Utilization and Occupancy Study".

The report included an environmental impact analysis.

The Commission concluded that the "northern environment, the people who live there and their communities, are extremely vulnerable to the impacts of large scale resource development" and these northern populations "do not have the capacity to influence the course of development". The report found that there were "no counter-balancing mechanisms in place to ensure that northerners benefit from development and that the northern environment is not irreparably harmed in the process." The report investigated the "potential of tourism, the tenuous position of the forest products industry and the forest resource base, mining activities, the conditions of the First Nations communities, as well as "public involvement in planning".

== Reed Inc ==
When the commission was first established in 1977, Reed Ltd had intended to build a new pulp and paper mill. Through the "Reed Agreement", the Ontario government had the company the "largest tract of forest land ever given to a single company". By 1985, the new mill was "no longer an economic proposition". Great Lakes Forest Products Ltd—Reed's successor did not "require wood from the Reed tract for its Dryden mill complex." The Commission recommends that the Reed Agreement be "repudiated be repudiated" and "no part of the tract be licensed for cutting until the Commission's major recommendations with respect to the northern forest are implemented".

== Mercury contamination in Grassy Narrows, Ontario, Canada ==
In regards to the mercury contamination of the river system used by the Grassy Narrows and White Dog First Nations "from which these communities derived employment and sustenance", the commission recommended that "until the claims of White Dog and Grassy Narrows are settled, the Government of Ontario should not grant any cutting rights to Great Lakes Forest Products Ltd., or any subsequent owner of the Dryden Mill Complex, in forest land outside existing company management units."
