= Harold Coward =

Canadian scholar of bioethics and religions (born 1936)

- Born: 1936 (age 89–90)
- Scientific career
- Fields: Bioethics, Religious Studies

Harold Coward FRSC (born 1936) is a Canadian scholar of bioethics and religious studies. A Bachelor in Divinity (Christian Theology), he earned a doctoral degree in Philosophy in 1973 from the McMaster University. He was a professor at University of Victoria and the University of Calgary. He is particularly known for his studies of Indian religions, as an editor of the Encyclopedia of Hinduism, and has been a Fellow of the Royal Society of Canada since 1991.

Coward is the author of many publications and has been profiled in the Vancouver Sun.

Coward's works and publications have been discussed multiple times in popular media. In 1994, the Vancouver Sun described Coward as "one of the world's leaders in creating a constructive religious response to the population crisis". In 1997, Coward was described as "arguably the most dynamic religion scholar in Canada today".

Coward was the first director at the University of Calgary Press (1981–83).

Coward was director of the University of Victoria's Centre for Studies in Religion and Society. Coward is a director at Genome British Columbia.

An honorary collection of essays has been dedicated to Coward.

== Publications (selected) ==
- Coward, Harold. (2019). Word, Chant and Song: Spiritual Transformation in Hinduism, Buddhism, Islam and Sikhism. Albany, NY: State University of New York Press. ISBN 978-1-4384-7575-2
- Coward, Harold. (2014). Fifty Years of Religious Studies in Canada: A Personal Retrospective. Waterloo, Ontario, Canada: Wilfrid Laurier University Press. ISBN 978-1771121163.
- Coward, Harold (2008). The perfectibility of human nature in eastern and western thought. Albany, NY: State University of New York Press. ISBN 978-0791473351. OCLC 733306474.
- Coward, Harold; Neufeldt, Ronald; Neumaier-Dargyay, Eva K. (2003). Readings in eastern religions (2nd ed.). Waterloo, Ontario, Canada: Wilfrid Laurier University Press. ISBN 978-0889204355. OCLC 80699880.
- Coward, Harold; Smith, Gordon S., eds. (2004). Religion and peacebuilding. Albany: State University of New York Press. ISBN 1417575743. OCLC 57579043.
- Coward, Harold (2003). Sin and salvation in the world religions a short introduction. Oxford: Oneworld Publications. ISBN 9781435684072. OCLC 291211095.
- Coward, Harold (2002). Yoga and psychology language, memory, and mysticism. Albany: State University of New York Press. ISBN 0585491372. OCLC 54029215.
- Coward, Harold, ed. (2000). Experiencing scripture in world religions. Maryknoll, NY: Orbis Books. ISBN 1570752982. OCLC 42888113.
- Coward, Harold G. (2000). Pluralism in the world religions: a short introduction (New ed.). Oxford: Oneworld. ISBN 1851682430. OCLC 44398623.
- Coward, Harold; Maguire, Daniel C., eds. (2000). Visions of a new earth religious perspectives on population, consumption, and ecology. Albany, NY: State University of New York Press. ISBN 0585281025. OCLC 45729284.
- McLaren, John; Coward, Harold, eds. (1999). Religious conscience, the state, and the law historical contexts and contemporary significance. Albany, NY: State University of New York Press. ISBN 0585059993. OCLC 42855370.
- Coward, Harold; Ratanakul, Pinit, eds. (1999). A cross-cultural dialogue on health care ethics. Waterloo, Ontario, Canada: Published for the Centre for Studies in Religion & Society by Wilfrid Laurier University Press. ISBN 0585322902. OCLC 45844414.
- Coward, Harold, ed. (1998). Traditional and modern approaches to the environment on the Pacific Rim tensions and values. Foreword by Maurice Strong. Albany, NY: State University of New York Press. ISBN 0585075344. OCLC 42855857.

== Dedicated to Coward ==
- Hawley, Michael; Singh, Pashaura, eds. (2013). Re-imagining South Asian religions : essays in honour of professors Harold G. Coward and Ronald W. Neufeldt. Leiden, Netherlands: Brill. ISBN 9789004242364. OCLC 809989042.
