= R v Thomas Equipment Ltd =

Decision of the Supreme Court of Canada

R v Thomas Equipment Ltd, [1979] 2 S.C.R. 529, is a major decision of the Supreme Court of Canada on the extraterritorial limits of the Constitution of Canada.

Thomas Equipment Ltd, a farm equipment supplier based on New Brunswick, sold machinery to a reseller in Alberta. Under Alberta law suppliers were required to buy back unsold equipment upon termination of the contract. The New Brunswick supplier argued that as they were not based on Alberta they were not subject to the Alberta law.

The majority of the Court held that Alberta law did apply to Thomas Equipment. In the Court's view, the company's decision to supply and market their goods in Alberta caused it to be subject to all the laws of the province.

== See also ==
- List of Supreme Court of Canada cases
