= Hard Choices (Coward book) =

2004 book by Harold Coward

- Hard Choices
- Author: Harold Coward; Andrew J. Weaver
- Language: English
- Subject: Climate change
- Publisher: Wilfrid Laurier University Press
- Publication date: 2004
- Publication place: Canada
- Media type: Print (Paperback)
- Pages: 282
- ISBN: 978-0889204423
- OCLC: 300938101

Hard Choices: Climate Change in Canada is a non-fiction compilation book about climate change in Canada, edited by Harold Coward and Andrew J. Weaver. It was published in paperback format by Wilfrid Laurier University Press in 2004.

Hard Choices received favorable reviews in academic journals including Great Plains Research: A Journal of Natural and Social Sciences, Environmental Reviews, Annals of the Association of American Geographers, and Bulletin of the American Meteorological Society.

== Contents summary ==
Hard Choices: Climate Change in Canada is presented as a work to help address societal questions surrounding climate change in Canada and the inherent problems caused by its impact. Editors Harold Coward and Andrew J. Weaver gathered together writers from Canada with backgrounds including humanism, social science, and engineering. These individuals contributed articles to the book assessing the effects of climate change in Canada and how it would result in changes on the levels of technology, society, finance, politics, and religion. A collaborative work, Hard Choices engages with multiple topics to provide information from multiple different perspectives together in one source. Contributors to the work grapple with the Kyoto Protocol, the reaction by the government of Canada to this international treaty, and the effectiveness of the treaty to society overall with respect to the issues posed by changes in the climate of the planet.

== Research ==
Research on Hard Choices was sponsored by the Centre for Studies in Religion and Society of the University of Victoria.

== Publication history ==
Hard Choices was first published in 2004 by Wilfrid Laurier University Press. It was published the same year as an eBook. A 2005 edition was published in German. A later eBook edition was released in 2006 in English.

== Reception ==
A review in Great Plains Research: A Journal of Natural and Social Sciences by Matthew Bramley wrote: "Hard Choices does cover the ground quite well, reviewing climate science, impacts, adaptation, technology, policy, law, equity, and ethics." The review criticized some of the essays for being a bit outdated, while others were considered timely.

Writing in the journal Environmental Reviews, Barry G. Rabe reviewed the book and commented: "It is one of those relatively rare edited collections that fits varied pieces into an appropriate package and, in the process, makes a profoundly important contribution to our understanding of climate change, particularly in the context of Canada."

Robert Balling reviewed the book for the journal Annals of the Association of American Geographers and wrote: "Hard Choices is very well written, free of errors, and nicely illustrated with many color maps and diagrams." Balling concluded: "I recommend the book to scholars, students, and policy makers who have interests in Canada, climate change, and humanistic dimensions of difficult environmental choices."

Hard Choices was reviewed in the Bulletin of the American Meteorological Society by Tom G. Brydges. The review observed: "Twenty highly qualified authors have contributed twelve chapters plus a summary that cover climate change in Canada from the basic science through politics, economics, and religion to national and international law. Hard questions regarding the value of emission controls versus adaptation to inevitable climate change are thoroughly discussed." Brydges strongly endorsed the work as a resource for those engaging in climate change politics on the global playing field, concluding: "This book should be mandatory reading for all future negotiators."

== See also ==
- Arctic Climate Impact Assessment
- Climate change in the Arctic
- Climate change in Canada
- Environmental issues in Canada
- List of countries by greenhouse gas emissions per capita
