= Mercury pollution in Canada =

Mercury is a poisonous element found in various forms in Canada. It can be emitted in the atmosphere naturally and anthropogenically, the main cause of mercury emission in the environment. Mercury pollution has become a sensitive issue in Canada for the past few decades and many steps have been taken for prevention at local, national, and international levels. It has been found to have various negative health and environmental effects. Methylmercury is the most toxic form of mercury which is easily accessible as well as digestible by living organisms and it is this form of mercury causing serious harm to human and wildlife health.

Mercury contamination in Grassy Narrows poisoned many people from the Asubpeeschoseewagong First Nation during the 1960s and 1970s in one of the worst cases of environmental poisoning in Canadian history. The effects of this poisoning are ongoing.

== Sources of mercury ==
=== Electricity generation ===
Coal-fired electricity generation used to cause the most mercury emissions in Canada. However, after the mercury-free environment campaign and 2010s provincial and territorial cap of mercury emission using coal, its rate dropped dramatically. It was 34% in 2003 which declined by approximately 50% by 2010 after the cap and some other measures (Canadian Council of Ministers of the Environment, 2016). Now, Canada is the second-largest generator of hydroelectricity in the world using only 9% of the coal-fired electricity.

=== Waste incineration ===
Many kinds of waste contain mercury (level vary from waste to waste) such as municipal solid waste, sewage waste, industrial waste, hazardous waste, biochemical waste, crematoria waste, farms waste, and so on. Waste incineration was a big contributor to mercury emission in the atmosphere, being in the top 2 in 2003 by having 20% of the total (Environment and Climate Change Canada, 2013). However, this went down to only 1.49 tonnes emission in 2007 and 0.44 tonnes in 2017 with a decrease of almost 70% (Government of Canada, 2020 July 3). This decline is mainly a result of processing the waste before disposal.

=== Base metal mining and smelting industry ===
This industry is one of the major mercury emitters in Canada which have witnessed an increase and decrease from time-to-time; for instance, from 1990 through 1995, emission cut down from 35 tonnes to 11 tonnes. However, it contributed the largest amount in 1995 by accounting for 40% of the total human-caused mercury emission, which again declined rapidly between 1995 and 2003 and recorded for only 7 tonnes of mercury discharge. In 2003, it reported for 19% of the total by still being in the top three Canadian mercury emitters (Environment and Climate Change Canada, 2013). This industry also has gone through many transformations after the mercury-free environment drive like, technological changes and mercury-free processing (at least to some extent).

=== Chloralkali industry ===
Until the 1980s, the chloralkali industry was the major source of the emission of mercury in Canada. In the 1970s, there were approximately 15 chloralkali factories which got reduced to one (which is in New Brunswick) after the implementation of mercury emission limits. This industry still contributes to mercury emission but, in quite small quantities because of the anti-pollution rules and reduction in the number of plants (Environment Canada, 2000).

== Process of conversion of mercury in an accessible form ==
The most common sources of entering mercury into the food chain are marine animals like fish and shellfish. Mercury can go into water naturally, such as runoffs or by human activities such as, disposal of toxic materials directly in the water. Then, it gets converted by bacterial actions from inorganic mercury into Methylmercury. Methylmercury is a form of mercury which is adsorbed by living organisms, it can be bioaccumulated^1 by bacteria and other marine insects in their tissues, which are further eaten by fishes(Green facts – Facts on the Health and the Environment, 2004). Fish is popular seafood frequently eaten by humans and other organisms in the food web and this is how it gets biomagnified^2 throughout the food chain, making almost everyone mercury-contaminated to some extent. According to research, big and old fishes are found to have a high level of mercury concentration in comparison to small and newborn fishes. Further, the higher the organisms are in the food chain, higher the concentration of Methylmercury is (Green facts – Facts on the Health and the Environment, 2004).

== Effects of the mercury ==
=== Environment ===
Mercury is unhealthy for the environment as it makes soil, water, and air toxic. It has become a common contaminant in all environments for the past few years but, it is not an issue everywhere. It becomes a problem for those environments only, which have a low reversible rate (of methylmercury) in comparison to its formation from inorganic mercury.

=== Wildlife ===
Mercury effects were first noticed in wildlife before humans, birds were noted having flying difficulties and some other abnormal behavior. Almost all kinds of mercury can be adsorbed by living organisms to some extent and all varied forms have their different impacts. Although methylmercury is the most common one, it is highly toxic and mainly sensitive to the nervous system. It also impacts the reproductive system and poses danger to developing fetus. According to studies, in birds, methylmercury can impact egg concentration, making it as low as 0.05 to 2.0 mg/kg (wet eggs). Moreover, some Canadian species are already found to be in this range. In few Canadian arctics, mercury concentration has risen by 2 to 4 times in the arctic ringed seals and beluga whales (Green facts – Facts on the Health and the Environment, 2004).

=== Human health ===
Health effects of mercury depend on various factors like form of mercury, age of the person, prior exposure health of the person, concentration, and how it gets into the individual (eating, breathing, etc.). According to researches, the most common form that is found in living organisms is methylmercury, called Minamata disease^3. Methylmercury can have serious effects on the nervous system, lowers immunity, malfunctioning and toxicity of kidney, numbness, skin related problems, hearing and sight issues, lack of muscle coordination, intellectual impairment, and so on. It also has shown severe effects on fetus and developing children (especially through mothers) causing serious nervous system, hearing, vision, and speech issues (United States Environment Protection Agency, 2020).

== Steps taken by the government ==
1. Light bulbs contain mercury are dumped in landfills in large quantities every year. So, according to Canada's national strategy for bulbs containing mercury, all mercury-containing lamps need to be collected and sent to special facilities which further process it and ensures environment friendly disposal of those bulbs. Moreover, citizens are made aware from time-to-time and are encouraged to purchase mercury-free products.

2. Energy generation using coal represents a huge emission of mercury in the environment. That is why people are encouraged to demand less energy through alternative ways, like using less electricity, installing energy savers at homes, using energy-efficient goods, etc. (Government of Canada, 2016, March 11).

3. There are a ton of products which contain mercury, Canadian government encourages the use of mercury-free items and have made many policies on the proper disposal of mercury-containing goods (Government of Canada, 2016, March 11).

4. Mercury is present in all lakes and rivers throughout the world, although often at very low concentrations. To avoid its consumption by humans (through marine animals, especially fish) federal, provincial, and territorial governments have created fish consumption advisories in accordance to varied species of fishes depending on locations to minimize the risk of mercury consumption (Government of Canada, 2013, July 9).

5. Governments have conducted a variety of research on different locations and sources and have published reports on official website for public use and knowledge.
