= Long-term drinking water advisories =

Drinking water advisories on Canada's First Nations communities

In Canada, First Nations communities have been under long-term drinking water advisories (DWAs) for decades. A long-term drinking water advisory is an advisory that has been in place for over a year. From November 2015 through January 19, 2024, 144 DWAs were lifted. 28 are still in effect in 26 communities.

The primary reasons DWAs are issued in First Nations communities are "disinfection (32%), equipment (30%), microbiological quality (18%), source water quality (6%), operation would compromise (8%), and turbidity (6%)", according to Health Canada, the Assembly of First Nations and the David Suzuki Foundation.

These advisories occur "when a water system is not functioning well ... because of equipment malfunction and/or operational issues which prevent the system from treating water to the required quality".

DWAs are put in place if a water line breaks, if there is equipment failure, or if there is "poor filtration or disinfection when water is treated." A DWA may be issued if the community does not have "someone trained to run the water system", or "someone trained to test and ensure the quality of the drinking water." There are three types of advisories—boil water, do not consume, and do not use.

== History ==
Since 1977, successive federal governments have investigated the problem and funded some solutions, but have never succeeded in resolving the water and sanitation infrastructure problems that lead to the issuance of DWAs. The limited water and sanitation infrastructure in First Nations communities, "contributes to the severe housing shortage on reserves", resulting in "long waiting lists for housing, and overcrowding". Until the infrastructure is upgraded, "communities cannot increase their housing."

For almost two decades—from 1996 to 2015—an arbitrary cap on the base budget of the Indian and Northern Affairs Canada (INAC), the federal department that funds and regulates water and sanitation infrastructure on reserves, limiting INAC to a 2% annual increase "regardless of population growth, inflation, or need." The funding constraints were first imposed under Prime Minister Jean Chrétien (1993–2003), and maintained during the premiership of Stephen Harper (2006–2015). These funding caps were criticized by the United Nations special rapporteur on the rights to water and sanitation, who "warned that imposing this type of cap can slow down the progressive realization of human rights, or worse, lead to retrogression". By November 2015, there were 105 DWAs in First Nations communities.

A June 7, 2016 report, Human Rights Watch (HRW) said that, while most Canadians in water-rich Canada—one of the world's wealthiest nations—have "access to sufficient, affordable, and safe drinking water and adequate sanitation", while "water supplied to many First Nations communities on lands known as reserves is contaminated, hard to access, or at risk due to faulty treatment systems". The report noted that many of the DWAs had been in effect "for years, sometimes for decades".

The remote northern Ontario community, Neskantaga First Nation, had "been on a boil water advisory since 1995". Shoal Lake 40 First Nation has been under a DWA, for twenty years, since at least 2006. In Shoal Lake, raw lake water is delivered through pipes to a pump house where it is disinfected with chlorine before being pumped into homes. Shoal Lake was still under a DWA by March 2021.

In February 2016, representatives from nine Ontario First Nations called for support at the UN Committee on Economic, Social and Cultural Rights in Geneva, for the improvement of the water and sanitation infrastructure on reserves, citing Shoal Lake as an example.

On World Water Day—March 22, 2016—Prime Minister Justin Trudeau, appointed as a result of the October 2015 Canadian federal election, committed approximately $4.6 billion over five years, to improve infrastructure—including water and wastewater systems—in indigenous communities across Canada.

Since 2016, more than $3.5 billion was allocated for water and wastewater infrastructure, which included funding for "more than 600 water and wastewater projects." Infrastructure was repaired, expanded, or replaced, training was strengthened across the country, and additional funding for operations and maintenance was allocated to communities.

On December 2, 2020, Marc Miller, Minister of Indigenous Services, announced additional investments of over $1.5 billion to "ensure clean drinking water in First Nations communities." At that time, there were an estimated 1,200 water and wastewater systems on First Nations reserves in Canada. Miller said that part of the $616.3 million the federal government promised spread over the following six years, as well as an additional ongoing $114.1 million a year afterwards, would focus on maintaining these water systems.

As of September, 2021, 117 DWAs had been lifted since November 2015 and 45 were in effect in 32 communities. By September 20, 2021, 72.3% of the advisories had been lifted, 8% were pending as the project construction had been completed, 17.3% of projects were under construction, 1.2% projects were in design phase, and 1.2% were under a feasibility study to address the DWA. Only three provinces still had DWAs in place by September 20, 2021—Saskatchewan had 4, Manitoba had 3, and Ontario had 24 DWAs in effect in 24 First Nations communities.

== Recent changes ==
As of January 19, 2024, 144 LT-DWAs had been lifted since November 2015. 26 communities had a total of 28 LT-DWAs still in effect by January 19, 2024.

As of December 14, 2022 On December 1, 2022, Wabigoon Lake Ojibway Nation's LT-DWA was lifted in the province of Ontario. On October 12, 2022, the LT-DWA at Sachigo Lake First Nation was lifted.

In December 2022, new long-term drinking water advisories were issued for Fort Severn First Nation and Chippewas of the Thames First Nation.

== Drinking water advisories by province ==
=== British Columbia ===
According to the First Nations Health Authority, in British Columbia, there were DWAs in 18 First Nations in 18 water systems—ten boil-water advisories and eight do-not-consume advisories, as of January 31, 2021. This list "includes water systems with 5 or more connections (CWS) and smaller water systems that have public facilities (PWS)." Affected communities include the Semiahmoo First Nation, Xeni Gwet'in First Nation, with 26 to 50 people affected, and Wetʼsuwetʼen First Nation, where 51 to 100 are affected.

=== Manitoba ===
By September 20, 2021, the Mathias Colomb First Nation, Tataskweyak Cree Nation, and Shamattawa First Nation were still under a DWA. With the completion of Sapotaweyak Wahta's $14.2-million water treatment plant in May 2021, the DWA was lifted.

=== Ontario ===
Of the 55 communities that were under a DWA as of March 1, 2021, the majority were in the province of Ontario.

By September 24, 2021, DWAs were still in effect in Anishnaabeg of Naongashiing, Bearskin Lake First Nation, Chippewas of Georgina Island First Nation, Chippewas of Nawash First Nation, Deer Lake First Nation, Eabametoong Oneida of the Thames First Nation, Gull Bay First Nation Kiashke Zaaging Anishinaabek, Marten Falls First Nation, Mishkeegogamang First Nation, Mississaugas of Scugog Island First Nation, Mohawks of the Bay of Quinte First Nation, Muskrat Dam Lake First Nation, Nibinamik, Nibinamik Neskantaga First Nation, North Caribou Lake, North Spirit Lake First Nation, Northwest Angle 33 First Nation, Ojibway Saugeen First Nation, Oneida of the Thames, Sandy Lake First Nation, Sachigo Lake First Nation, Shoal Lake 40 First Nation, Wabaseemoong, and Wawakapewin First Nation. DWAs were lifted in Anishinabe of Wauzhushk Onigum, Washagamis Bay, and Wawakapewin First Nation in 2021.

By November 2016, the province of Ontario had "81 DWAs in 44 First Nations, with 68 of those classified as long-term". (Note: According to the 2017 report, Glass Half Empty", "[u]nder the constitutional division of powers, services in First Nations are an area of federal responsibility. Under the Constitution, First Nations, Inuit and Métis peoples are recognized as “Aboriginal peoples” with distinct rights. The term Aboriginal is equivalent to the term Indigenous, which is used to define a set of unique state obligations in international law.")

According to the study undertaken in from 2015 to 2016, 20% of First Nations households in Ontario relied on a "private well for drinking water", and 57% of households "relied on a household septic system".

==== Asubpeeschoseewagong First Nation ====
In the 1960s and 1970s, a chemical plant tied to the Reed Paper mill in Dryden, Ontario—upstream of Grassy Narrows—dumped 9,000 kilograms (20,000 lb) of mercury into the English River and Wabigoon River, contaminating the fish. making it "one of Canada's worst environmental disasters". INAC had relocated the Asubpeeschoseewagong First Nation from their traditional lands on "islands and peninsulas" southeast of the Wabigoon-English River in Western Ontario to the area where the watershed had been contaminated. By 2016, three generations of the Grassy Narrows First Nation communities had been impacted by the contamination. At that time there were about 1,000 people on the reserve.

==== Constance Bay First Nations ====
The federal government provided $5.8 million, Constance Lake First Nation contributed $933,087, and the Ontario government funded $820,000 for a new water treatment plant for Constance Bay FN near Hearst in northern Ontario. The DWA, which had been in place since 2014, was lifted in 2016. The new system required $793,920 in additional repairs in 2017.

==== Mohawks of the Bay of Quinte First Nation ====
The Mohawks of the Bay of Quinte First Nation have been under a DWA since 2008, "due to fecal, bacterial and algae contaminations". During a drought in the area, many of the groundwater wells—upon which they had depended—went completely dry.

During the COVID-19 pandemic in Canada, supply chains from manufacturers were disrupted, resulting in an increase in the 8-kilometre (5.0 mi) water main project from about $8.1 million to $18.2 million. In December 2020, the federal government announced new funding of $16.7 million to "cover the cost of extending the water mains" from the township of Deseronto and the MBQ's own water-treatment plants which will then be able to serve five areas in the Tyendinaga Mohawk Territory.

This funding supported the final phase in the "multi-phase project to improve access to safe drinking water for the MDQ community. The federal government and the First Nation invested a combined total of $18.2 million towards the project, which will "ultimately lift five long-term drinking water advisories in the community". This final phase was contracted out to Gordon Barr Limited, who began construction work in December 2020. The new water mains will link the MDQ's and Deseronto's water treatment plant, thereby connecting "86 existing homes and several of the community's semi-public buildings". By 2021, there were about 2,200 people living on the Mohawks of the Bay of Quinte reserve with another 3,000 Mohawks living nearby. Of these, there are about 90 families "on a waiting list for affordable housing".

=== Saskatchewan ===
By September 2021, there were only three communities with DWAs in effect—Little Pine First Nation, Ministikwan Lake Cree Nation, Peepeekisis Cree Nation, Star Blanket Cree Nation, and Okanese First Nation. In 2021, DWAs in White Bear First Nation, Little Saskatchewan First Nation, and Peter Ballantyne Cree Nation had been lifted.
