= Grassy Narrows First Nation =

English River 21 Asabiinyashkosiwagong
- Indian reserve
- English River Indian Reserve No. 21
- Location within Ontario
- Coordinates: 50°11′N 94°02′W
- Country: Canada
- Province: Ontario
- District: Kenora
- First Nations: Asubpeeschoseewagong

Government
  - Tribal Chief: Rudy Turtle

Area
  - Land: 39.69 km^{2} (15.32 sq mi)

Population (2023)
  - Total: 1,608
  - Density: 16.1/km^{2} (42/sq mi)

Grassy Narrows First Nation (also known as Asubpeeschoseewagong First Nation or the Asabiinyashkosiwagong Nitam-Anishinaabeg in the Ojibwe language) is an Ojibwe First Nations band government who inhabit northern Kenora in Ontario, Canada. Their landbase is the 4,145 ha (10,240 acres) English River 21 Indian Reserve. It has a registered population of 1,595 as of October 2019, of which the on-reserve population was 971. As of October 2023, the community had a registered population of 1,608. They are a signatory to Treaty 3.

== Overview of environmental disaster ==
Generations of Grassy Narrows residents continue to suffer from the physical, social, and economic costs of the discharge of approximately ten tons of mercury into the Wabigoon River between 1962 and 1970 by the Dryden pulp and paper mill, 100 kilometres (62 mi) upstream of Grassy Narrows, poisoning the water and the fish—the staple food of the Grassy Narrows First Nations.

The community was under a long-term drinking water advisory from about 2013 through October 2020, when it was lifted. In the spring of 2020 the federal government reached an agreement with Grassy Narrows to "build a $20 million clinic for those suffering from mercury poisoning".

== Governance ==
Chief Randy Fobister was elected in 2020, There are four councillors, Cody Keewatin, Art Anderson, Roy Assin, and Arnold Pahpasay Jr.

The First Nation is a member of the Bimose Tribal Council, a regional non-political Chief's Council, who is a member of the Grand Council of Treaty 3, a political organization.

The reserve is also part of the provincial riding of Kenora-Rainy River and federal riding of Kenora.

=== Indigenous law ===
In April 2021, the nation enacted the Alcohol Inagonigaawin, a traditional Anishinaabe law on alcohol possession departing from the Canadian Indian Act regulations. The law limits alcohol possession to 750 millilitres of wine, one 12-pack of beer, or 26 ounces of liquor spirits, with those in violation of the law to go before a traditional, community justice panel.

== History ==
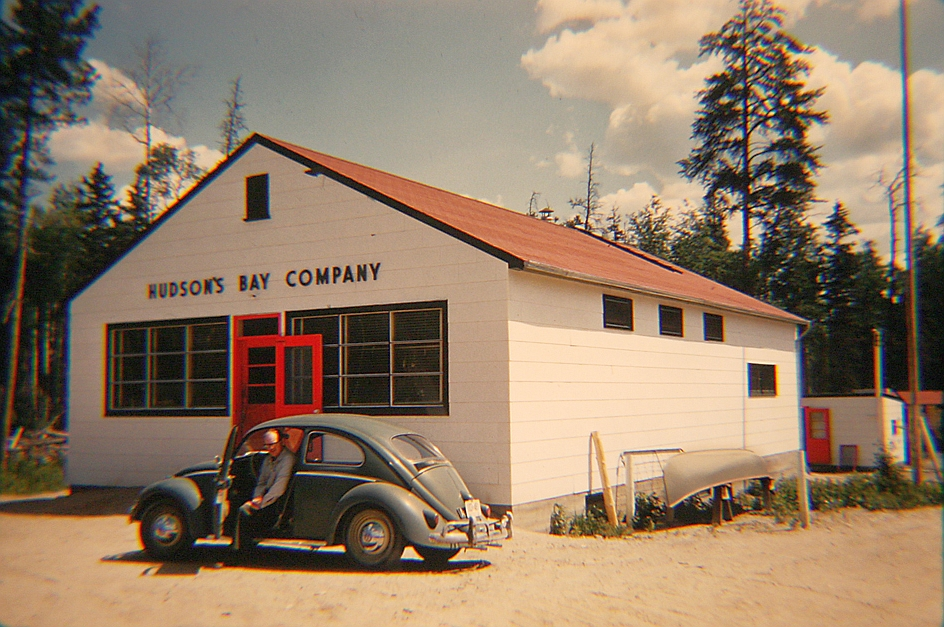
Hudson's Bay Store in Grassy Narrows, early 1960s

=== Original history ===
The Asubpeeschoseewagong people themselves say that they have always lived along the Wabigoon River, a river that flows from Raleigh Lake past Dryden, Ontario on Wabigoon Lake to join the English River. It is located northeast of Lake of the Woods.

Historians believe that the ancestors of the Northern Ojibway first encountered Europeans near what is now Sault Ste. Marie, Ontario and thus were given the name Saulteaux. Their territory was on the northern shore of the Great Lakes from the Michipicoten Bay of Lake Superior to the Georgian Bay of Lake Huron. Participation in the North American fur trade was initially through trading of furs trapped by other tribes, but soon the Saulteaux acquired trapping skills and emigrated to their present location as they sought productive trapping grounds.

=== 1800s ===
In 1871, Grassy Narrows First Nation, together with other Ojibway tribes, made a treaty with the Canadian government, The Crown, in the person of Queen Victoria, giving up aboriginal title to a large tract of land in northwestern Ontario and eastern Manitoba, Treaty 3 between Her Majesty the Queen and the Saulteaux Tribe of the Ojibbeway Indians at the Northwest Angle on the Lake of the Woods with Adhesions. In exchange a spacious tract of land, as much as a square mile of land for each family, in a favourable location on the Wabigoon-English River system was reserved for the use of the tribe. Tribal members were allowed to hunt, fish, and trap on unused portions of their former domain; the government undertook to establish schools; and to give ammunition for hunting, twine to make nets, agricultural implements and supplies, and a small amount of money to the tribe. Alcoholic beverages were strictly forbidden.

On original Treaty 3 lands, the cycle of seasonal activities and traditional cultural practices of the Ojibway were followed. The people continued to live off the land in the traditional life style. Each clan lived in log cabins in small clearings; often it was .5 mi (0.80 km) to the nearest neighbour. Each parcel was selected for access to fishing and hunting grounds and for suitability for gardening. The winters were spent trapping for the Hudson's Bay Company, the summer gardening and harvesting wild blueberries which together with skins were sold for supplies. Potatoes were grown on a community plot. In the fall, wild rice was harvested from the margins of the rivers and finished for storage. Muskrat were plentiful and trapped for pelts and food. There were deer and moose on the reserve which were hunted for meat and supplemented by fish. Work was available as hunting and fishing guides and cleaning tourist lodges. White people seldom entered the reserve except for the treaty agent who visited once a year. The only access to the reserve was by canoe or plane.

The Ojibway had yielded ownership of their territory to Canada, through the signing in 1873 of Treaty 3. Treaty 3 gave the Ojibway the "right to harvest the non-reserve lands that they had yielded in exchange until such lands were "taken up" for settlement, industry, or other government purposes."

=== 1900-1950 ===
From 1876 to 1969 schooling was at McIntosh Indian Residential School, a residential school in McIntosh, Ontario. The school property consisted of 320 acres (130 ha) located at the southeast end of Canyon Lake on a small bay. There was a CNR station not far from the school. A trail was created to link the school. The main access to the school was by a barge, that brought supplies, equipment, livestock and students.

In 1912, the land, which is now known as the Keewatin, was annexed to the province of Ontario.

Until the late 1940s, the Grassy Narrows' community had "maintained economic autonomy." In 1947 to 1948, the Government of Ontario, implemented "resource management and licensing" through the Ontario Department of Lands and Fisheries—in 1972, the Ontario Ministry of Natural Resources.

=== 1950-2000 ===
In 1963, the federal government relocated the Grassy Narrows band to a new reserve adjacent to the English-Wabigoon River.

Between 1962 and 1970, Dryden Chemicals Ltd—a subsidiary of the British multinational—Reed International, discharged approximately nine or ten tons of mercury into the Wabigoon River, 100 kilometres (62 mi) upstream of Grassy Narrows, poisoning the fish which were the staple food of the Grassy Narrows First Nations. It is "one of Canada's worst environmental disasters".

In 1975, Dr. Masazumi Harada tested mercury levels in Grassy Narrows community members and found that they were "more than three times the Health Canada limit in Grassy Narrows and seven times the limit in nearby Whitedog". Harada returned to do more testing 2004, and found that "all of the people who had tested over the limit were dead." In response to these tests, Leo Bernier, who was the Ontario Minister of Natural Resources in 1975, said on CBC's As It Happens that there were "no real damages" to the First Nations of the Grassy Narrows and White Dog areas and that the federal authorities had verified that.

In 1984, the environment minister at that time, said that the river was cleaning itself, and there was no need for government intervention.

In 1985, the Reed Paper Company that bought-out the Dryden Pulp and Paper Company and its sister-company Dryden Chemical Company, Great Lakes Forest Products, the governments of Canada and Ontario provided approximately $17 million compensation to the Grassy Narrows and Wabaseemoong First Nations as part of a legal settlement for the health effects of mercury in their communities. In 1985, the province of Ontario granted the Dryden mill and any future owners a broad indemnity, assuming all environmental liabilities related to the mill and its mercury dumping."

In her 1985 book, Poison Stronger than Love: The Destruction of an Ojibwa Community, Anastasia Shkilnyk described the deterioration of the morale of the community, the unraveling of their social fabric, and finally the devastation wrought by mercury contamination of the river watershed and the poisoning of the fish upon which the community depended. Using statistical data on "violent death, illness, and family breakdown", Shkilnyk traced the history and described the "devastating impacts of mercury contamination on the health and livelihood of the Grassy Narrows.

In 1997, the Government of Ontario issued a forestry licence for clear-cutting to Abitibi-Consolidated Inc.

In the late 20th century the ownership of the industry transferred from Reed Paper Company to other companies, including brief ownership (1998-2000) by Weyerhaeuser Co. and lengthier ownership by Bowater until circa 2007.

=== 2000s ===
In 2002, community members began the Grassy Narrows road blockade to prevent clearcutting on their territory. The blockade was ongoing in 2023.

In 2005, Grassy Narrows filed a legal challenge against the province of Ontario in regards to the license granted to Abitibi-Consolidated in an "effort to stop the logging", which initially succeeded. The Ontario Court of Appeal overturned this ruling saying that "s. 109 of the Constitution Act, 1867 provides Ontario with ownership of crown lands in Ontario." The court found that Ontario also has provincial jurisdiction in natural resources and was therefore "entitled to sell the land". The province of Ontario began discussions with Grassy Narrows on September 8, 2007 on "forestry-related issues." with former Supreme Court of Canada and Federal Court of Canada Chief Justice Frank Iacobucci lead the discussions. The focus was on "sustainable forest management partnership models and other forestry-related matters, including harvesting methods, interim protection for traditional activities and economic development."

In the early 2010s, the government of Ontario had ordered the Weyerhaeuser Company and Resolute Forest Products—previously known as AbitibiBowater Inc., which in turn was Abitibi-Consolidated before merging with Bowater—to clean a "mercury waste-disposal site" near Grassy Narrows First Nation "where toxic material from a pulp-and-paper mill’s operations entered the English-Wabigoon river system in the 1960s."

In a unanimous July 2014 decision by the Supreme Court of Canada, in Grassy Narrows First Nation v. Ontario (Natural Resources), the justices "determined that Ontario had the jurisdiction to take up Treaty 3 land and therefore had the right to "limit First Nation harvesting rights."

A 2016 confidential report by an environmental consulting firm, commissioned by Domtar—who have owned and operated the Dryden pulp and paper mill since 2007—revealed that Ontario provincial authorities "knew decades ago that the site of the mill was contaminated with mercury," according to a 2017 article in the Star. The report included archival reports from the mill which showed that ground water samples collected by the company over many years had "extremely high mercury levels". In February 2016, Ontario's Ministry of the Environment said that there was no need for remediation other than natural sedimentation. That summer, Kas Glowacki, who has since collaborated on research regarding the mercury poisoning, reported that when he worked for the mill in the early 1970s, he had been "part of a group who 'haphazardly' dumped drums filled with salt and mercury into a pit behind the mill".

In a 4-3 decision on December 6, 2019, the Supreme Court of Canada ruled that Weyerhaeuser Company and Resolute Forest Products—previously known as Abitibi-Consolidated are responsible for cleaning the mercury-contaminated site near Grassy Narrows First Nation. According to Global News, the Court decision "brought some clarity to a long-running dispute over one element of the legacy of environmental poisoning that has caused significant health problems for many residents."

A 2023 study showed that the intergenerational effects of Methylmercury poisoning on Grassy Narrows children’s mental health, including risk of attempting suicide.

== Environment ==
=== Timber extraction ===
On September 8, 2007, Ontario announced that it "had agreed to begin discussions with Grassy Narrows First Nation on forestry-related issues." The provincial government appointed former Supreme Court of Canada and Federal Court of Canada Chief Justice Frank Iacobucci to lead these discussions. Iacobucci's discussions with Grassy Narrows would focus on, "sustainable forest management partnership models and other forestry-related matters, including harvesting methods, interim protection for traditional activities and economic development."

The reserve's other environmental concern is the mass extraction of trees for paper. Abitibi-Consolidated has been harvesting trees in the area. Local protestors have complained to the company and the Ministry of Natural Resources to demand a selective process. The community fears mass logging will lead to damage to local habitat.

On August 17, 2011, First Nation supporters won a victory in court, when "Ontario's Superior Court ruled that the province cannot authorize timber and logging if the operations infringe on federal treaty promises protecting aboriginal rights to traditional hunting and trapping." There were no immediate injunctions issued to stop logging activity, however.

In December 2014, a request for an individual environmental assessment into the impact of clear-cut logging was denied by the province. Later released documents, after freedom of information requests, revealed concerns by local biologists that were never followed up on.

== Local services and transportation ==
The reserve is connected to areas beyond by local roads connecting with Highway 671. This highway provides connection to Kenora, 68.7 km (42.7 mi) to the south.

The closest airport is Kenora Airport and provides connections to other large communities including Thunder Bay and Winnipeg.

The reserve has one school, Sakatcheway Anishinabe School, the serves students from junior kindergarten to grade 12. From 1876 to 1969 McIntosh Indian Residential School was the closest school in McIntosh, Ontario.

A medical centre provides basic health care to residents and open Monday to Friday. There is no hospital on the reserve; thus, more advanced care requires transfers to Kenora.

Treaty Three Police Service provides policing for the reserve.

== Mercury contamination in Grassy Narrows, Ontario, Canada ==
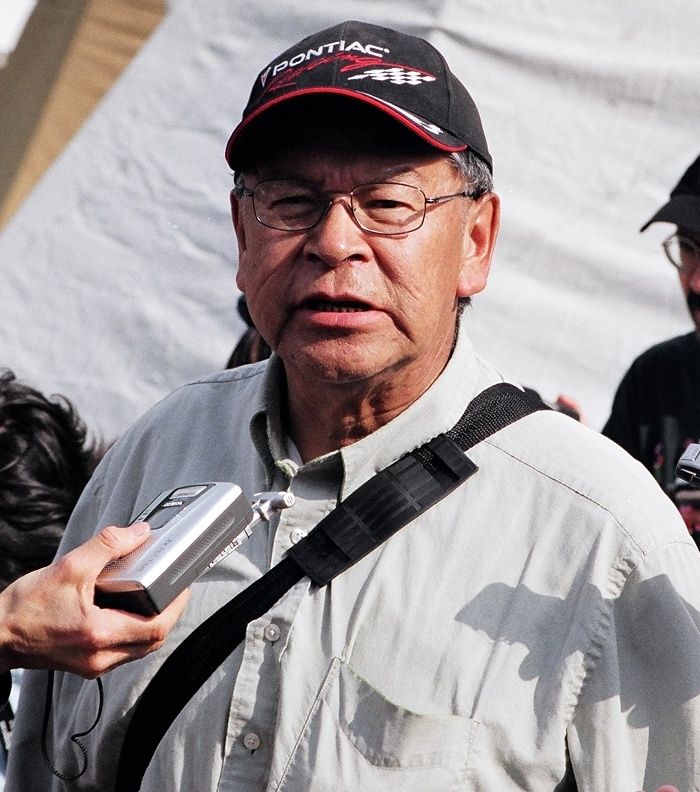
Elder Bill Fobister, speaking at a protest at Queen's Park in Toronto

The First Nations people experienced mercury poisoning from Dryden Chemical Company, a chloralkali process plant, located in Dryden that supplied both sodium hydroxide and chlorine used in large amounts for bleaching paper during production for the Dryden Pulp and Paper Company. The Dryden Chemical company discharged their effluent into the Wabigoon-English River system. It is believed that approximately 10 tons (20,000 pounds) of mercury was dumped into the Wabigoon River system between 1962 and 1970. Both the paper and chemical companies ceased operations in 1976, after 14 years of operations. However, time has not lowered the levels of mercury in the Wabigoon River system as the paper and pulp industry in Dryden and the Canadian government had originally told the residents. Workers from the industry have admitted that there are a multitude of hidden mercury containers near the Wabigoon River that have caused health problems among the Asubpeeschoseewagong First Nation community to be a continuous issue. The waste from the industry upstream has not merely affected the Wabigoon River system, the mercury contamination has also infected water sources that the Wabigoon River system feeds into such as Clay Lake and Ed Wilson Landing. Additionally, the chemical waste from the industry in Dryden has impacted the health of the Asubpeeschoseewagong First Nation peoples, as well as the Wabaseemoong First Nation community (Wabaseemoong Independent Nations) further downstream.

The mercury poisoning among the two First Nations communities was possible due to the lax laws regarding environmental pollution. The former spokesman for Indigenous and Northern Affairs Canada, Chris Bentley claimed that the policies pertaining to the environment have since been amended to prevent occurrences like the disposal of mercury by the pulp and paper industry in Dryden. Conversely, the mercury contamination by the pulp and paper industry may be defined as environmental racism.

The Ontario provincial government has initially told the First Nation community to stop eating fish—their main source of protein—and closed down their commercial fishery. In 90%+ unemployment rate in 1970, closing of the commercial fishery meant economic disaster for the Indian reserve. The closure of the fishery affected the once-booming tourism industry, where locals acted as guides for out of town fisherman. Ivy Keewatin claimed that on the guided tours that she once conducted, she would take the attendees to a particular area in order to eat deep-fried pickerel (walleye). As the soil in the river and the sediment contains high levels of mercury, the fish in the Wabigoon River system may no longer be safely ingested. Therefore, it is because the Indigenous guides did not feel comfortable suggesting that tourists eat the fish contaminated with mercury and because the tourists did not wish to ingest fish with high levels of mercury that the fishing tourist industry no longer exists in the Asubpeeschoseewagong First Nation community.

Grassy Narrows First Nation received a settlement in 1985 from the Government of Canada and the Reed Paper Company that bought out the Dryden Pulp and Paper Company and its sister-company Dryden Chemical Company. Moreover, in June 2017, the Ontario government pledged $85 million to clean up the industrial mercury contamination. However, the mercury was never removed from the water and continues to affect the health of Grassy Narrows residents. Government agencies responsible for the cleanup and study of the mercury pollution in the Wabigoon River system fear that dredging the sediments in the Wabigoon River may increase the levels of mercury downstream. Thus, it is because the government entities do not wish to pollute the Wabigoon River system furthermore that the lack of cleanup is strategic rather than malicious.

The amount of mercury present in fish as of 2012 was low according to Health Canada, although a health advisory still remains in effect. Consumption of fish continues in the area, particularly pickerel (walleye), the local favourite, but it is high on the food chain and therefore contains high levels of mercury. Walleye remains dangerous for those with long-term exposure to the consumption of the fish as walleye contains approximately 13–15 times the recommended levels of mercury. In particular, because the walleye contain roughly 40–90 times the advisable mercury intake limit for pregnant women, children and women who hope to bear offspring, the walleye is predominately hazardous.

Some of the health issues associated with the consumption of the mercury infested fish in the Asubpeeschoseewagong First Nation community includes numbness, hearing loss, headaches, dizziness and limb cramps. Additionally, studies have found that the Asubpeeschoseewagong First Nation have experienced hypertension, stroke, as well as lung, stomach, psychiatric, orthopedic and heart diseases due to eating fish with high levels of mercury. Though there have been obvious health issues associated with the consumption of fish from the Wabigoon River system, Ed Wilson Landing, and Clay Lake, the Asubpeeschoseewagong First Nation community continue to eat the fish from these bodies of water. Factors that may contribute to the ongoing consumption of fish in this region include the role of fish as a cultural symbol and the socioeconomic status of some members of the Asubpeeschoseewagong First Nation, as the community cannot afford to obtain boats in order to fish farther away from the infected waterways or pricey groceries.

== See also ==
- Mercury contamination in Grassy Narrows, Ontario, Canada
- Ontario Minamata disease
- Mercury poisoning
- Grassy Narrows road blockade
- Grassy Narrows First Nation v. Ontario (Natural Resources)
