= Wabigoon =

Wabigoon could refer to:

- Wabigoon Lake
- Wabigoon River
- Wabigoon Lake Ojibway Nation
- Wabigoon, Ontario
