= Favel =

Favel may refer to:

- Favel, Ontario, an unincorporated place in Canada
- Favel Lake, the source of the Canyon River (Ontario)
- Favel Formation, a geologic formation in Manitoba, Canada
- Favel Parrett, Australian writer
- Favel Wordsworth, American baseball player
