= Paper and pulp industry in Dryden, Ontario =

Coordinates: 49°47′N 92°50′W

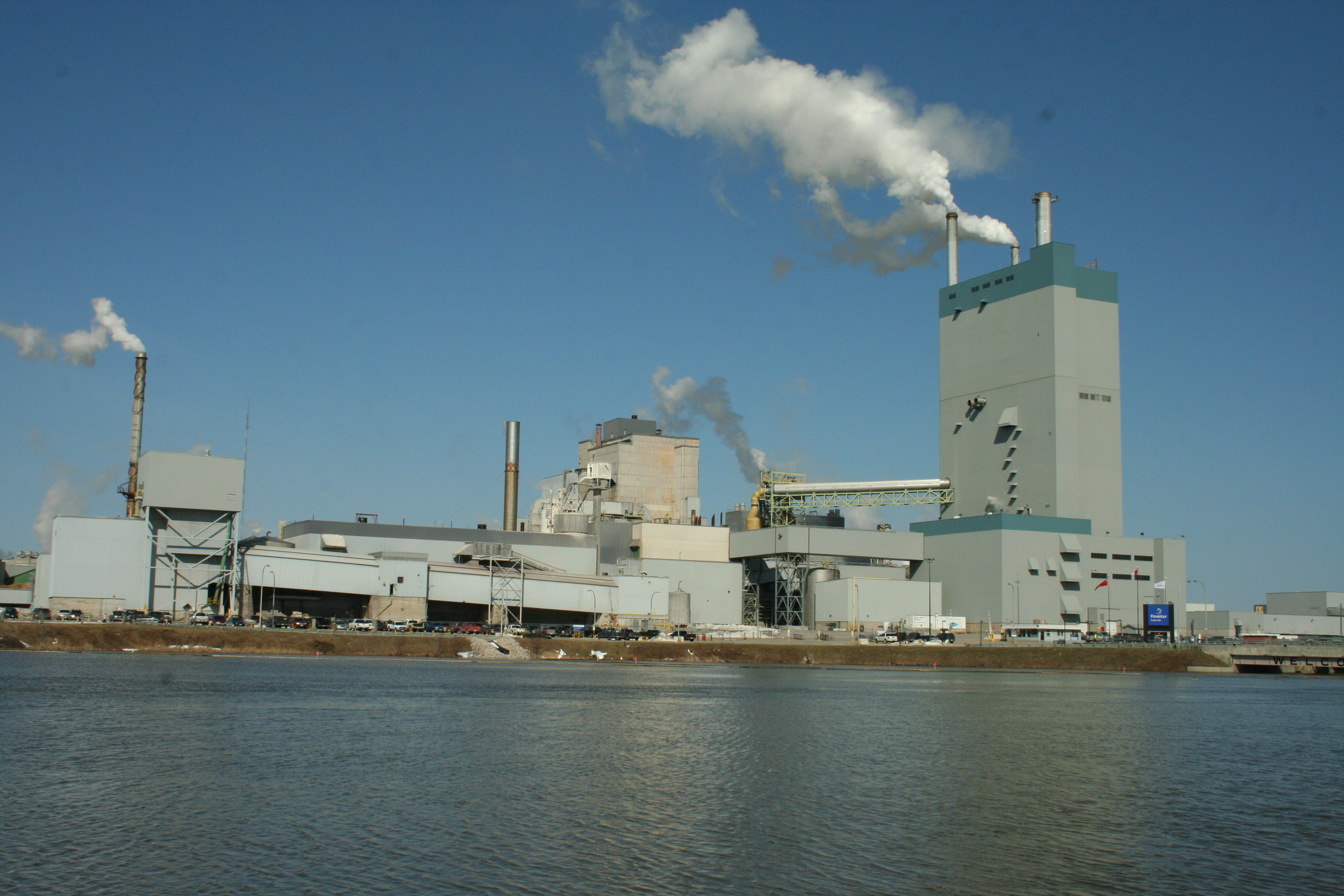
Dryden Mill in 2008

The Dryden pulp mill, also known as the Reed Mill, is a paper and pulp mill in Dryden, Ontario. During the 1960s and 1970s, mercury poisoning from the mill caused one of Canada's worst environmental disasters: Dryden Chemicals Ltd dumped mercury into the English-Wabigoon River, upstream of Grassy Narrows First Nation, poisoning the fish which were their staple food. Members of the Grassy Narrows and the Whitedog communities downstream from the mill suffered severe mercury poisoning. Additionally, the mill was the subject of a W5 investigative report, published in 2021, into claims that workers involved in the Recovery Boiler #4 (RB4) project were intentionally exposed to toxic fumes by their employer during its construction between 2002 and 2004. As of 2024, the RB4 project is also the subject of an ongoing occupational disease investigation by Occupational Health Clinics for Ontario Workers (OHCOW).

The first iteration of the mill was initially built by Charles and Grant Gordon in 1909 on the west side of the Wabigoon River From the early 20th century to the 21st century, the forest industry has played a significant role in Dryden's economy.

In 2019, the Supreme Court of Canada ruled that Weyerhaeuser Company and Resolute Forest Products—previously known as Abitibi-Consolidated—are responsible for remediating the mercury contamination. The environmental poisoning continues to cause significant health problems for the First Nations communities downstream. The Government of Canada is building a $20 million clinic to treat the First Nations "suffering from mercury poisoning".

Since a US$520 million purchase of the mill by Domtar from Weyerhaeuser, in 2007, the mill has produced Northern Bleached Softwood Kraft pulp product.

== Location ==
The city of Dryden, which is in the Kenora District of Northwestern Ontario, Canada, on Wabigoon Lake—the headwater of the Wabigoon River near the Manitoba border, was ideally located for the pulp-and-paper industry with its abundant hydroelectricity supply from the Wabigoon River and a plentiful supply of wood. Dryden, as of 2016, had a population of 7,749. Dryden is the second-largest city in the Kenora District of Northwestern Ontario, Canada, located on Wabigoon Lake. It is the smallest community in the province of Ontario designated as a city.

The plant is located upstream of White Dog First Nation and Grassy Narrows First Nation.

== History of the Dryden mill (1800s - 1970s) ==
In 1909, Charles and Grant Gordon began the construction of a paper mill on the west side of the Wabigoon River, where a paper mill is currently located. The mill's location has some advantages, because it has an abundant electricity supply from the river and a plentiful supply of wood. During the late 1890s, there were several sawmills operating in the Dryden, Ontario area. They primarily supplied the builders of the Canadian Pacific Railway(CPR) with railway timber, and powered the many steam boilers used for mining in that area. Since the early 1900s and the opening of the first sawmill in Dryden, the forest industry has played a significant role in the economy of the city. (Note: According to Bonny Skene then working for Domtar Ltd., the first mill called the Gordon Pulp and Paper Company (1909–1909) had burned down before it was completed. It was replaced with the Dryden Timber and Power Company (1911–1918) which was operational in 1913. From 1918 to 1920, the mill was called the Dryden Pulp and Paper Company. It was called the Dryden Paper Company from 1920 to 1953. When it was purchased by the Anglo-Canadian Pulp and Paper Company in 1953, both the management and the name, Dryden Paper Company, remained the same. In 1960, when the Reed Paper Group acquired the Anglo-Canadian Paper Mills Limited, the name continued to be the Dryden Paper Company. The company was called Reed Limited from 1975 to 1979, when it was renamed Great Lakes Forest Products. In 1988, the Canadian Pacific Forest Products Limited was created with the merger of Great Lakes Forest Products with Canadian International Paper Inc. From 1994 to 1998, Avenor Incorporated owned the mill.)

In 1911, the rights of the timber lease were transferred from the Gordon brothers to the Dryden Timber and Power Company because the building they were constructing burned down in 1910, and they did not have means to complete their project.

Dryden Timber and Power Company constructed a new mill and started to operate in 1913; it was the first Kraft pulp mill in Northwestern Ontario. Power chain saws, safety pants and safety gloves were introduced with the ownership of Dryden Paper Company in the early 1960s, resulting in a tremendous increase in productivity for the loggers.

== Mill operations ==
In the 1970s, the plant had a capacity of 350 tons of pulp per day, representing approximately 4% of all wood pulp made in Ontario. Waste water from the wood processing flowed into the Wabigoon River.

As demand for their products decreased in 2009, hundreds of workers were laid off.

== Environmental disaster ==
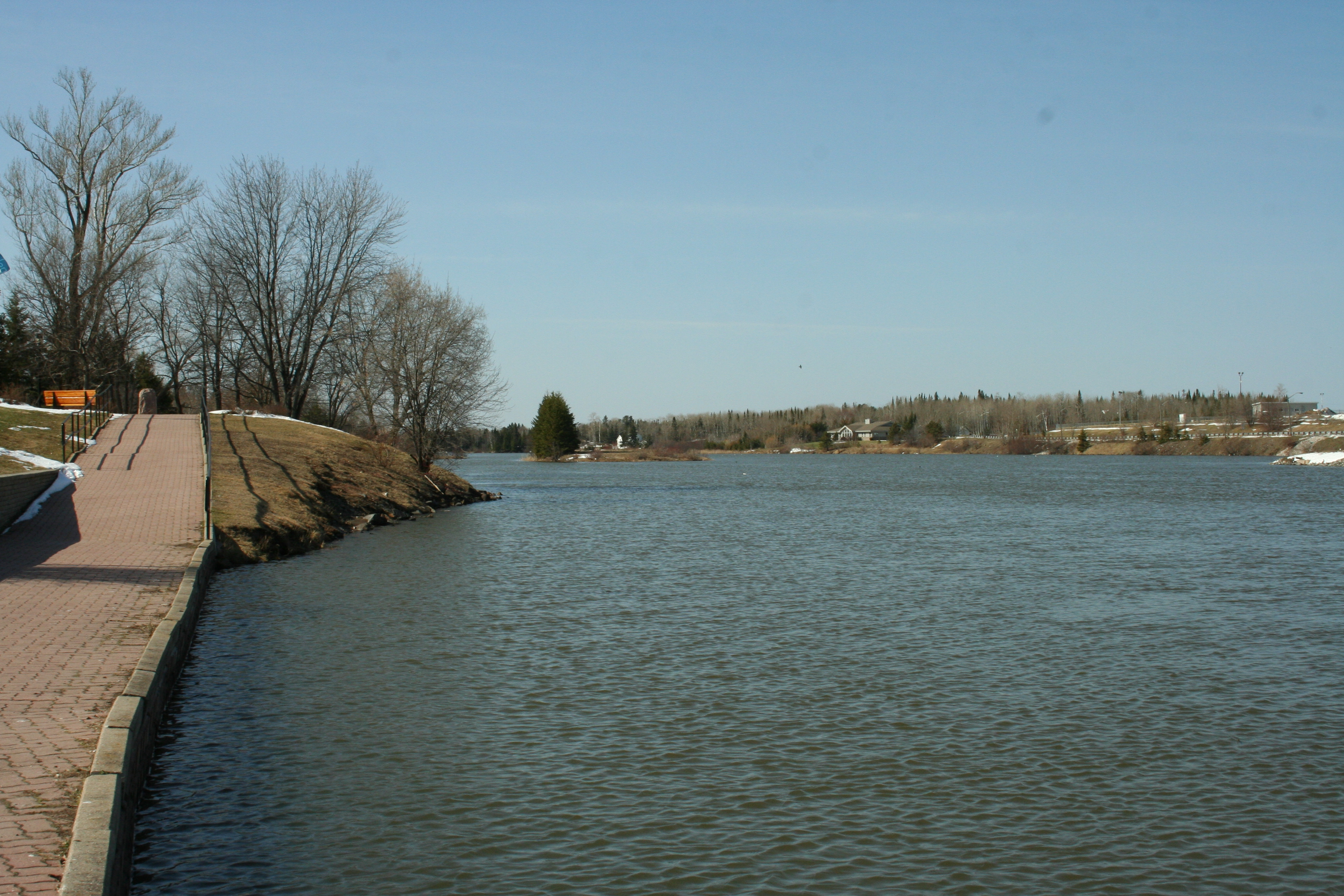
The Wabigoon river as it exits Wabigoon Lake

Dryden Chemicals Ltd., a subsidiary of the British multinational, Reed International, dumped 9,000 kilograms (20,000 lb) of mercury into the English-Wabigoon River upstream of Grassy Narrows First Nation from 1962 to 1970. This slow poisoning of the water system is considered one of Canada's worst environmental disasters.

Dryden Chemicals used mercury cells in sodium chloride electrolysis to make caustic soda and chlorine for bleaching paper The English-Wabigoon River served as a source of a food and drinking water and contributed to the local economy through fishing and guiding.

By 1970, the river was polluted with chemical waste. This spread to the Winnipeg River and eventually to Lake Winnipeg. As a result, the people of Grassy Narrows and Whitedog suffered from mercury poisoning, including Minamata disease. Mercury never dissolves and is bioaccumulative.

Plans to build a second mill in 1977 were halted by the conclusions from the Recommendation of the Royal Commission on the Northern Environment.

About 850 First Nations people were living on the two reserves when the mercury issue arose, and they were told to stop eating fish and drinking water. Also, the commercial fishery and fishing guides services were forced to close, resulting in mass unemployment in the community. Furthermore, "the impact of the mercury poisoning on the local economy had not received attention for a long time."

In 2015, a former employee claimed he had participated in further dumping drums of mercury in 1972. Grassy Narrows Chief Simon Frobisher believes this dumping was done at a separate, un-monitored site.

Since the mercury poisoning, the Grassy Narrows community "have lived with the consequences of one of the worst cases of environmental poisoning in Canadian history."

=== Company response ===
In 1985, Dryden chemical executives repeatedly insisted that mercury occurred naturally in the local environment, and the mill's effluence was not the only source of mercury in the river. However, fish taken from the area of the mill showed much higher levels of mercury than fish from other areas.

=== Government response ===
The Ontario government warned the First Nation residents to stop eating fish, which is their main staple food, and closed down their commercial fishery in November 1970. Even though the hair and blood samples of people in Grassy Narrows and White Dog showed that the blood mercury levels exceeded the level considered safe for humans, the Canadian federal government denied the occurrence of Minamata disease and insisted that no serious typical cases were found in those regions. Even a 1971 provincial report suggested that the mercury might have occurred naturally because of its chemical property.

The definition of Minamata disease was not clear at the time, and the level of contamination in Japan's case of Minamata disease was much more serious and lethal than the ones in Canada. Also, the symptoms of Minamata disease are similar to alcoholic inebriation, including loss of coordination and concentration and body tremors. Public awareness of the problem grew during the 1970s. The federal government paid $4.4 million ($13,635,490 today) to Grassy Narrows for social service and economic development on July 27, 1984. The federal government has paid more than $9 million for compensation to the First Nations affected by the mercury contamination.

=== Indigenous community response ===
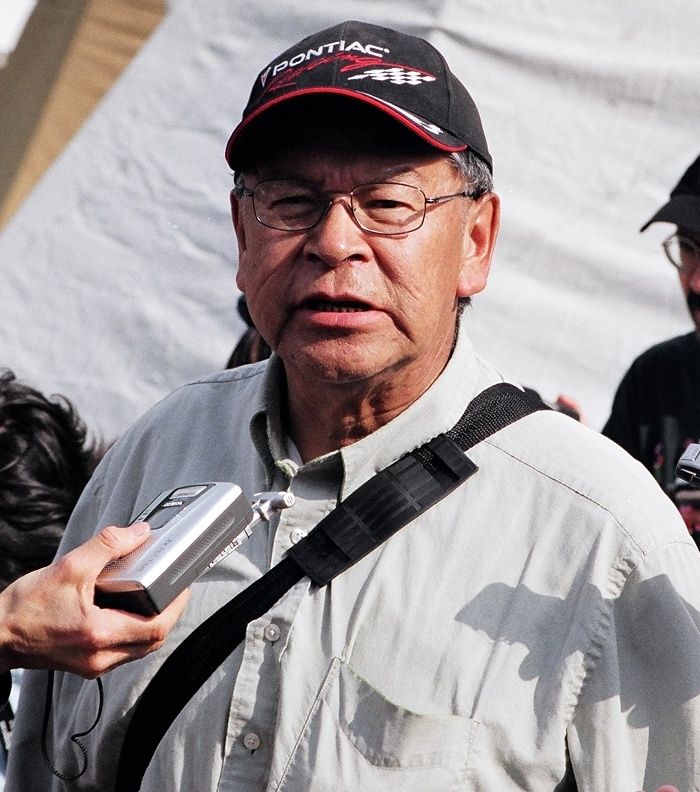
Elder Bill Fobister, speaking at a protest at Queen's Park in Toronto.

On June 6, 2016, Indigenous Chief Fobister led a march with a thousand protestors in downtown Toronto, to "demand a clean up of the mercury poison that has been left in their river for over 50 years". Chief Fobister announced that an expert report, which was released on June 6, 2016, had found that the river was "still highly contaminated" and that "it can be cleaned safely".

=== Current status ===
In 2024, a research team, led by Western biology professor Brian Branfireun, detected heightened levels of methylmercury in the English-Wabigoon River system. Combined with the existing mercury in the rivers, Branfireun said "[t]he combination of sulphate and organic matter from the mill was elevating the creation of the more toxic, methylmercury in the river."

== Domtar Corporation (2007 - 2023) ==
In March 2007, Domtar purchased the Mill from Weyerhaeuser for approximately US$520 million. It has an annual pulp production capacity of 319,000 tonnes in 1 pulp line.

Domtar Corporation acquired the mill and became the largest integrated producer of uncoated paper in North America and the second-largest in the world in terms of production capacity, owns a pulp manufacturer in Dryden that produces one pulp product called Northern Bleached Softwood Kraft (NBSK). The mill produces 319,000 air dry metric tons of NBSK annually, which is sold on the open market. However, the paper and pulp sector is facing economic deterioration.

On April 2, 2009, Domtar Corporation announced that it would idle its Dryden pulp making mills for approximately ten weeks starting April 25, 2009 due to the lack of global demand for pulp. As a result, 230 workers have been off work since the mill closed. However, mill employees working in Dryden began slowly returning to work at Domtar's pulp mill in July 2009.

== First Quality (2023-) ==
In February 2023, Domtar announced they had entered an agreement to sell Domtar's Dryden pulp mill to First Quality, "a closely held, diversified group of companies manufacturing, selling and distributing branded and private label absorbent hygiene, paper and packaging products into the healthcare, retail and commercial channels." The acquisition was closed in August 2023.
