= Canyon River =

Canyon River may refer to:

- Canyon River (Ontario)
- Canyon River (film), a 1956 film directed by Harmon Jones
