= 1970 Minamata disease outbreak in Ontario =

1970 Outbreak of severe mercury poisoning amongst Ontario First Nations

Minamata disease is a neurological syndrome caused by severe mercury poisoning, normally as a result of pollution. A toxicological outbreak occurred in the Canadian province of Ontario, in 1970, and severely affected two First Nation communities in Northwestern Ontario following consumption of local fish contaminated with mercury, and one First Nation in Southern Ontario due to illegal disposal of industrial chemical waste. The term Minamata disease references an infamous case of severe mercury poisoning amongst the fishing community of Minamata, Japan.

== Source of the mercury pollution ==
=== Grassy Narrows and Whitedog First Nations ===
In 1962, Dryden Chemical Company began operating a chloralkali process plant in Dryden, Ontario, using mercury cells. It produced sodium hydroxide and chlorine that were used in large amounts for bleaching paper during production by the nearby Dryden Pulp and Paper Company. Both companies were subsidiaries of the British multinational, Reed International.

Dryden Chemical Company discharged their effluent directly into the Wabigoon-English River system. In 1970, extensive mercury contamination was discovered in this river system, leading to closure of the commercial fishery and some tourism related businesses. On March 26, 1970, the Ontario provincial government ordered Dryden Chemical Company to cease dumping mercury into the river system, although the order did not place any restrictions on airborne emissions of mercury by the company. It was estimated that over 9,000 kg of mercury had been dumped by the company into the Wabigoon-English river system between 1962 and 1970. The airborne emissions of mercury continued unabated until the company stopped using mercury cells in its chloralkali process in October 1975; the company closed down in 1976.

=== Sarnia First Nation ===
The Aamjiwnaang First Nation (the Chippewas of Sarnia) is located on the St. Clair River, affectionately called by the local population "Chemical Valley". This First Nation is plagued by numerous chemical affective disorders, including mercury poisoning. Elders in the community recall collecting mercury from the local toxic waste dump by pouring water, then selling the collected mercury on the black market.

== Health effects ==
=== Grassy Narrows and Whitedog First Nations ===
In the late 1960s, people in the Grassy Narrows and Whitedog First Nations populations started to have symptoms of mercury poisoning. Several Japanese doctors who had been involved in studying Minamata disease in Japan travelled to Canada to investigate the mercury poisoning in these people. Blood mercury levels were above 100 ppb in a significant number of individuals and above 200 ppb in several others. Symptoms included sensory disturbances, such as narrowing of the visual field, and impaired hearing, abnormal eye movements, tremor, ataxia (impaired balance), and dysarthria (poor articulation of speech).

Health effects continued to be felt, even in young people, in the 21st century. Dumping of drums of mercury which continue to leak is suspected, and field work by Brian Branfireun and others continues to monitor the health of the ecosystem.

== Lawsuits and settlements ==
=== Grassy Narrows and Whitedog First Nations ===
The Asabiinyashkosiwagong Nitam-Anishinaabeg or the "Grassy Narrows First Nation" and their downstream neighbours, the Wabaseemoong Independent Nations (then known as the "Whitedog Community of the Islington Band of Saulteaux") "sought compensation for loss of jobs and way of life. According to the Department of Indian and Northern Affairs (INAC) Ontario Region Communications, "on March 26, 1982, Canada contributed $2.2 million to Wabaseemoong for economic development, social and educational programs. Wabaseemoong also signed a settlement with Ontario in January 1983. On July 27, 1984, Canada contributed $4.4 million to Grassy Narrows for economic development and social service development/planning."

According to INAC, a Memorandum of Agreement (MOA) reached in 1985 between the federal government, the Ontario government, Reed Limited, and Great Lakes Forest Products Ltd. resulted in a one-time compensation payment of $16.67 million with the federal government contributing $2 million, the Ontario government paying. Through the 1986 "Grassy Narrows and Islington Indian Bands Mercury Pollution Claims Settlement Act". Through this claims settlement, the Kenora, Ontario-based Mercury Disability Fund (MDF) and the Mercury Disability Board. The Government of Ontario held $2 million of this settlement in a trust fund which the province is "responsible for replenishing when the balance drops below $100,000.

Nevertheless, the community members have seen little of this money, due to conditions on its use and bureaucratic requirements by band councils. Similarly to other First Nations communities, the federal government's Indian Act governance system has made it difficult for band councils and chiefs to negotiate for their people.

Chief Sakatcheway was the first leader of community when the treaty was signed and mainly wanted education for the community.

== See also ==
- Environmental justice
- Environmental racism
- Heavy metal poisoning
- Minamata disease
- Niigata Minamata disease
- Mercury poisoning
