= RELX =

British-Dutch multinational publishing and information company

RELX plc

- Headquarters building, London
- Formerly: Reed Elsevier plc (1993–2015)
- Type: Public
- Traded as: LSE: REL; FTSE 100 component; Euronext Amsterdam: REN; AEX component; NYSE: RELX (ADR)
- ISIN: GB00B2B0DG97
- Industry: Information and analytics
- Predecessor: Elsevier; Reed International PLC
- Founded: August 1993; 33 years ago (by merger)
- Headquarters: 1-3 The Strand, London, UK
- Key people: Paul Ashton Walker (chairperson); Erik Engström (CEO); Nick Luff (CFO)
- Products: Information and data analytics, academic and business publishing, exhibitions
- Revenue: ▲£9.590 billion (2025)
- Operating income: ▲£3.027 billion (2025)
- Net income: ▲£2.078 billion (2025)
- Total assets: ▼£14.757 billion (2025)
- Total equity: ▼£2.390 billion (2025)
- Number of employees: 36,000 (2026)
- Subsidiaries: Elsevier; LexisNexis; RX; LexisNexis Risk Solutions
- Website: www.relx.com

RELX plc (pronounced "Rel-ex") is a British multinational information and publishing company headquartered in London, England. Its businesses include scientific, technical, medical and legal information and event organisation. It operates in 40 countries and serves customers in over 180 nations. Previously known as Reed Elsevier, the company came into being in 1993 through the merger of Reed International, a British trade book and magazine publisher, and Elsevier, a Netherlands-based scientific publisher.

The company is publicly listed, with shares traded on the London Stock Exchange, the Amsterdam Stock Exchange and the New York Stock Exchange. The company is a constituent of the FTSE 100 Index, the AEX Index, the Financial Times Global 500 and the Euronext 100 Index.

== History ==
Previously known as Reed Elsevier, the company came into being in 1993 as a result of the merger of Reed International, a British trade book and magazine publisher, and Elsevier, a Netherlands-based scientific publisher. The company rebranded itself as RELX in February 2015.

=== Reed International ===
In 1895, Albert E. Reed established a newsprint manufacturing operation at Tovil Mill near Maidstone, Kent. The Reed family was Methodist and encouraged good working conditions for their staff in the then-dangerous print trade.

In 1965, Reed Group, as it was then known, became a conglomerate, creating its Decorative Products Division with the purchase of Crown Paints, Polycell and Sanderson's wallpaper and DIY decorating interests.

In 1970, Reed Group merged with the International Publishing Corporation and the company name was changed to Reed International Limited. The company continued to grow by merging with other publishers, producing high-quality trade journals under IPC Business Press Ltd and women's and other consumer magazines under IPC Magazines Ltd. Reed entered the United States in 1977 by acquiring Cahners Publishing, founded by Norman Cahners.

In 1985, the company decided to rationalise its operations by focusing on publishing and selling off its other interests. Sanderson was sold to WestPoint Pepperell, Inc. of Georgia, United States, that year, while Crown Paints and Polycell were sold to Williams Holdings in 1987. The company's paper and packaging production operations were bundled together to form Reedpack and sold to the private equity firm Cinven in 1988. Reed then expanded its publishing division by acquiring Technical Publishing from Dun & Bradstreet.

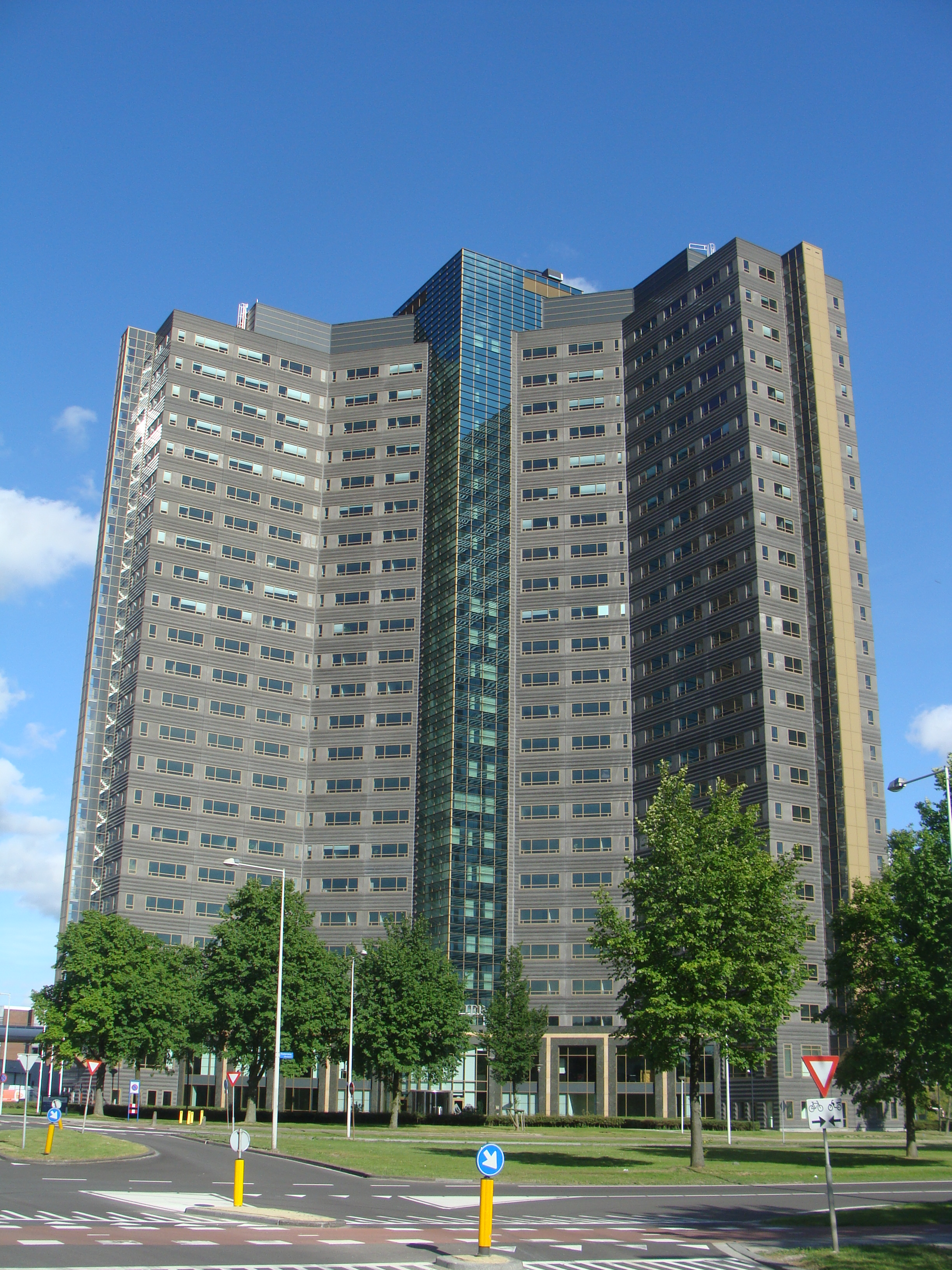
Amsterdam headquarters of Elsevier

=== Elsevier NV ===
In 1880, Jacobus George Robbers started a publishing company called NV Uitgeversmaatschappij Elsevier (Elsevier Publishing Company NV) to publish literary classics and the encyclopedia Winkler Prins. Robbers named the company after the old Dutch printers family Elzevir, which, for example, had published the works of Erasmus in 1587. Elsevier NV was originally based in Rotterdam but moved to Amsterdam in the late 1880s.

Up to the 1930s, Elsevier remained a small family-owned publisher, with no more than ten employees. After the war it launched the weekly Elsevier magazine, which turned out to be very profitable. A rapid expansion followed. Elsevier Press Inc. started in 1951 in Houston, Texas, US, and in 1962 publishing offices were opened in London and New York. Multiple mergers in the 1970s led to name changes, settling at "Elsevier Scientific Publishers" in 1979. In 1991, two years before the merger with Reed, Elsevier acquired Pergamon Press in the UK.

=== Cahners Publishing ===
Cahners Publishing, founded by Norman Cahners, was the largest U.S. publisher of trade or business magazines as of his death in 1986. Reed International acquired the company in 1977.

=== Reed Elsevier and RELX ===
==== Significant acquisitions ====
Division or subsidiary of RELX	Date	Acquisition	Value
Cahners Publishing	1986–09	Technical Publishing Inc, a publisher of industrial, medical and technology trade magazines, from Dun & Bradstreet	$250 million
Reed Elsevier	1993–08	Official Airline Guides Inc, a publisher of airline schedules	$425 million
Reed Elsevier	1994–10	LexisNexis, an on-line information business	$1.5 billion
Reed Elsevier	1997–03	MDL Information Systems Inc, a US software systems and information database developer	$320M
Reed Elsevier	1997–06	Chilton Business Group, a US business information publishing company	$447M
Reed Elsevier	1998–04	Matthew Bender & Company Inc, a US publisher of legal information	$1.65bn
Reed Elsevier	2000–10	Harcourt, an education publishing business	$4.5bn plus debt
LexisNexis	2004–07	Seisint of Boca Raton, Florida, which provided the company with access to HPCC Systems for the first time	$775M
Reed Elsevier	2005–05	Medimedia, a medical publisher whose imprints included Medicine Publishing and Masson	$270M
Reed Elsevier	2008–02	Choicepoint, which had been a spinoff of Equifax's Insurance Services Group in August 1997. The acquisition was completed in September 2008.	$4.1bn
Reed Business Information	2008–03	Heren Energy, a London-based publisher of newsletters and market reports on the competitive wholesale energy markets in Britain and Europe. Continued as ICIS Heren.	
Reed Business Information	2011–06	Ascend, a London-based civil aviation data analytics company	Undisclosed
Reed Elsevier	2011–11	US online-data business Accuity Holdings Inc. from investment firm Investcorp	£343M ($530.1M)
LexisNexis Legal & Professional	2012–03	Law360, a US-based online provider of legal information and analysis	Undisclosed
Elsevier	2013–04	Mendeley, a London-based desktop and web program for managing and sharing research papers, discovering research data and collaborating online	Undisclosed but up to $100M
LexisNexis Risk Solutions	2013–09	Mapflow, a Dublin-based group that helps insurance companies assess geographic risk, in particular in relation to flooding	Undisclosed
LexisNexis Risk Solutions	2014–04	Tracesmart, a UK-based provider of tracing, identity verification, fraud prevention and anti-money laundering software	Undisclosed
LexisNexis Risk Solutions	2014–05	Wunelli, a telematics data business which uses driving data for insurers, enabling them to reduce risk exposure and deliver discounts to safer drivers	£25m
Accuity	2014–09	Fircosoft, a Paris-based anti-money laundering company	€150M
LexisNexis Risk Solutions	2014–11	Health Market Science (HMS), a supplier of high quality data about US healthcare professionals	Undisclosed
LexisNexis Risk Solutions	2015–01	BAIR Analytics, a US-based law enforcement data company	Undisclosed
LexisNexis Legal & Professional	2015–07	MLex, a media organization providing exclusive analysis and commentary on regulatory risk	Undisclosed
Reed Business Information	2015–10	Adaptris, a fast-growing supply chain integration business	Undisclosed
LexisNexis Legal & Professional	2015–11	Lex Machina, a US-based online provider of legal analytics	Undisclosed
LexisNexis Risk Solutions	2016–07	Insurance Initiatives, Ltd. (IIL), a business which provides a data distribution platform that extracts, hosts and processes large quantities of data to deliver information predominantly into the point-of-quote in the UK's Property & Casualty Insurance industry.	Undisclosed
LexisNexis Legal & Professional	2017–06	Ravel Law, a San Francisco-based legal analytics company	Undisclosed
LexisNexis Risk Solutions	2018–01	ThreatMetrix, one of the largest repositories of online digital identities in the world	£580M ($830M)
Reed Exhibitions	2018–02	Gamer Network, a mass media video game journalism company	Undisclosed
LexisNexis Risk Solutions	2020–01	ID Analytics	$375m
LexisNexis Risk Solutions	2020–02	Emailage	$480m
Elsevier	2020–08	Scibite	£65m
Elsevier	2022–06	Interfolio	Undisclosed
RX	2023–07	Corp Events	Undisclosed

==== Significant divestments ====
In February 1997, Reed Elsevier divested its trade publishing group (including Heinemann, Methuen, Secker & Warburg, Sinclair-Stevenson, Mandarin, Minerva and Cedar) to Random House. In 1998, Reed Elsevier sold the children's divisions of Heinemann, Methuen, Hamlyn and Mammoth to the Egmont Group.

In February 2007, the company announced its intention to sell Harcourt, its educational publishing division. On 4 May 2007 Pearson, the international education and information company, announced that it had agreed to acquire Harcourt Assessment and Harcourt Education International from Reed Elsevier for $950m in cash. In July 2007, Reed Elsevier announced its agreement to sell the remaining Harcourt Education business, including international imprint Heinemann, to Houghton Mifflin for $4 billion in cash and stock.

Between 2006 and 2019, in 65 separate deals, the company systematically sold its 300 print, business to business magazine titles, reducing the proportion of print revenues from 51% to 9%. Advertising, which had been the largest source of revenues when RELX was founded, represented just 1% of sales in 2018.

In July 2009, Reed Elsevier announced its intention to sell most of its North American trade publications, including Publishers Weekly, Broadcasting & Cable, and Multichannel News, although it planned to retain Variety. Sister publication Video Business to Variety was closed in January 2010.

In April 2010, Reed Elsevier announced that it had sold 21 US magazines to other owners in recent months, and that an additional 23 US trade magazines, including Restaurants & Institutions, Hotels, and Trade Show Week would cease publication. The closures were mostly due to the weak economy including an advertising slump. Variety, the company's last remaining North American title, was sold in October 2012.

In 2014, Reed Business Information sold BuyerZone, an online marketplace; emedia, an American provider of research for IT buyers and vendors; and a majority stake in Reed Construction Data, a provider of construction data.

In 2016, RELX sold Elsevier Weekly and BeleggersBelangen in the Netherlands. In 2017, the company sold New Scientist magazine. In January 2019, RBI sold its Dutch agricultural media and selected international agricultural media portfolio (including Poultry World) to Doorakkeren BV. In August 2019, Flight International and FlightGlobal were sold to DVV Media Group. In December 2019, RBI announced plans to sell the Farmers Weekly magazine title, website and related platforms, events and awards to MA Agriculture Limited, part of the Mark Allen Group. In May 2024, RX sold the Gamer Network to IGN Entertainment, division of Ziff Davis. However, it retained the EGX convention and Popverse.

== Operations and market segments ==
=== Scientific, Technical & Medical ===
RELX's Scientific, Technical & Medical business provides information, analytics and tools that help investors make decisions that improve scientific and healthcare outcomes. It operates under the name of Elsevier:

ScienceDirect, an online database of primary research, contains 16 million documents.

Scopus is a bibliographic database containing abstracts and citations for academic journal articles. It contains more than 50 million items in more than 20,000 titles from 5,000 publishers worldwide.

Mendeley is a desktop and web program for managing and sharing research papers, discovering research data and collaborating online.

Elsevier is the world's largest publisher of academic articles. It published 600,000 articles in 2021. Its best-known titles are The Lancet and Cell. In 1995, Forbes magazine (wrongly) predicted Elsevier would be "the first victim of the internet" as it was disrupted and disintermediated by the World Wide Web.

=== Risk Management ===
LexisNexis Risk Solutions provide decision-making tools which help banks spot money launderers and insurance companies weed out fraudulent claims. The business claims to have saved the state of Florida more than $60 million a year by preventing benefit fraud. LexisNexis Risk Solutions provides data and analytics services to 85% of the Fortune 500, nine of the world's top 10 banks and 23 of the world's 25 top insurers.

==== Accuity Inc. ====
Accuity provides financial crime compliance software which allows institutions to comply with sanctions and anti-money laundering compliance programmes. It offers KYC, online subscription-based data and software for the financial services industry. The company's services include helping banks and financial institutions screen for high risk customers and transactions, and providing databases such as Bankers Almanac which allows clients to find and validate bank payment routing data. Accuity serves financial services clients worldwide.

==== Cirium ====
Cirium (previously known as FlightGlobal) provides data and aviation analytics products to the aviation, finance and travel industries.

=== Legal ===
RELX's legal business operates under the LexisNexis brand. Many of LexisNexis' brands date back to the nineteenth century or earlier. These include Butterworths and Tolley in the UK and JurisClasseur in France. In 2019, 85% of its revenues were electronic. The LexisNexis legal and news database contains 119 billion documents and records.

=== Exhibitions and popular culture ===
RELX's exhibitions business is called RX, formerly Reed Exhibitions until 2021. It is the world's largest exhibitions company, running 500 shows for 140,000 exhibitors and 7 million visitors.

ReedPop, part of RX, organises popular culture events including New York Comic Con and PAX. In February 2018, ReedPop acquired Gamer Network, a British mass media company that owns a number of video game journalism sites including Eurogamer, Rock Paper Shotgun and VG247. Ecommerce store The Haul focused on pop culture memorabilia and merchandise was launched in 2021. Popverse, a popular culture news website, was founded in 2022. In 2024, RELX sold Gamer Network to Ziff Davis subsidiary IGN Entertainment. In September 2026, it was announced that Popverse would no longer publish news content, though it would still operate as a platform for fans, offering access to panels, autographs, photo-ops, etc.

== Governance ==
As of 2021, the board of directors consisted of:

- Chair: Paul Walker
- Chief Executive: Erik Engström
- Chief Financial Officer: Nick Luff
- Non-executive directors:
  - Wolfhart Hauser
  - Robert MacLeod
  - Charlotte Hogg
  - June Felix
  - Marike van Lier Lels
  - Linda Sanford
  - Andrew Sukawaty
  - Suzanne Wood

In 2019, Harvard Business Review ranked Erik Engström the world's 11th best performing CEO.

In August 2020, RELX announced Sir Anthony Habgood would retire as Chair, to be replaced by Paul Walker in the first half of 2021.

== Corporate affairs ==
=== Corporate strategy ===
From 2011 to 2014, the average annual value of acquisitions was about $300m. The predictability of the company's results in recent years has led to a re-rating of the shares.

=== Financial performance ===
RELX Combined	2005	2006	2007	2008	2009	2010	2011	2012	2013	2014	2015	2016	2017	2018	2019	2020	2021	2022	2023	2024	2025
Revenue (£m)	5,166	4,509	4,584	5,334	6,071	6,055	6,002	6,116	6,035	5,773	5,971	6,895	7,355	7,492	7,874	7,110	7,244	8,553	9,161	9,434	9,590
Adjusted operating profit (£m)	1,142	1,081	1,137	1,379	1,570	1,555	1,626	1,713	1,749	1,739	1,822	2,114	2,284	2,346	2,491	2,076	2,210	2,683	3,030	3,199	3,342
Adjusted EPS (p)	31.5p	33.6p	35.9p	44.6p	45.9p	43.4p	46.7p	50.1p	54.0p	56.3p	60.5p	72.2p	81.0p	84.7p	93.0p	80.1p	87.6p	102.2p	114.0p	120.1p	128.5p

=== Social responsibility ===
The RELX Environmental Challenge awards grants to projects advancing access to safe water and sanitation.

In 2019, Mike Walsh, CEO of LexisNexis, was honoured by the UN Foundation with a Global Leadership award for the company's work in advancing the Rule of Law - recognizing the company's commitment to strengthening equality under law, transparency of law, independent judiciaries and accessible legal remedy.

The Elsevier Foundation supports libraries in developing countries, women scientists and nursing facilities. In 2016 it committed $1m a year, for 3 years, to programmes encouraging diversity in science, technology and medicine and promoting science research in developing countries.

Programmes operated by LexisNexis Legal & Professional include:

- With the Atlantic Council, launching the first draft of the Global Rule of Law Business Principles which will help businesses, law firms and NGOs promote and uphold the rule of law.
- With the International Bar Association, launching an application called eyeWitness to Atrocities, designed to capture GPS coordinates, date and time stamps, sensory and movement data, and the location of nearby objects such as Wi-Fi networks. The technology also creates a secure chain of custody to help verify that the images and video has not been edited or digitally manipulated. The goal is to create content that can be used in a court of law to prosecute perpetrators of atrocities and human rights abuses.

Programmes operated by LexisNexis Risk Solutions include:

- The ADAM (Automated Delivery of Alerts on Missing Children) programme in the US, developed by employees in 2000, which assists in the recovery of missing children through a system of targeted alerts. As of 2017 the programme has helped trace 177 missing children.
- Social Media Monitor, which assists law enforcement officials in investigating serious crimes such as drug dealing and human trafficking.

== Controversy ==
=== Mercury contamination in Grassy Narrows ===
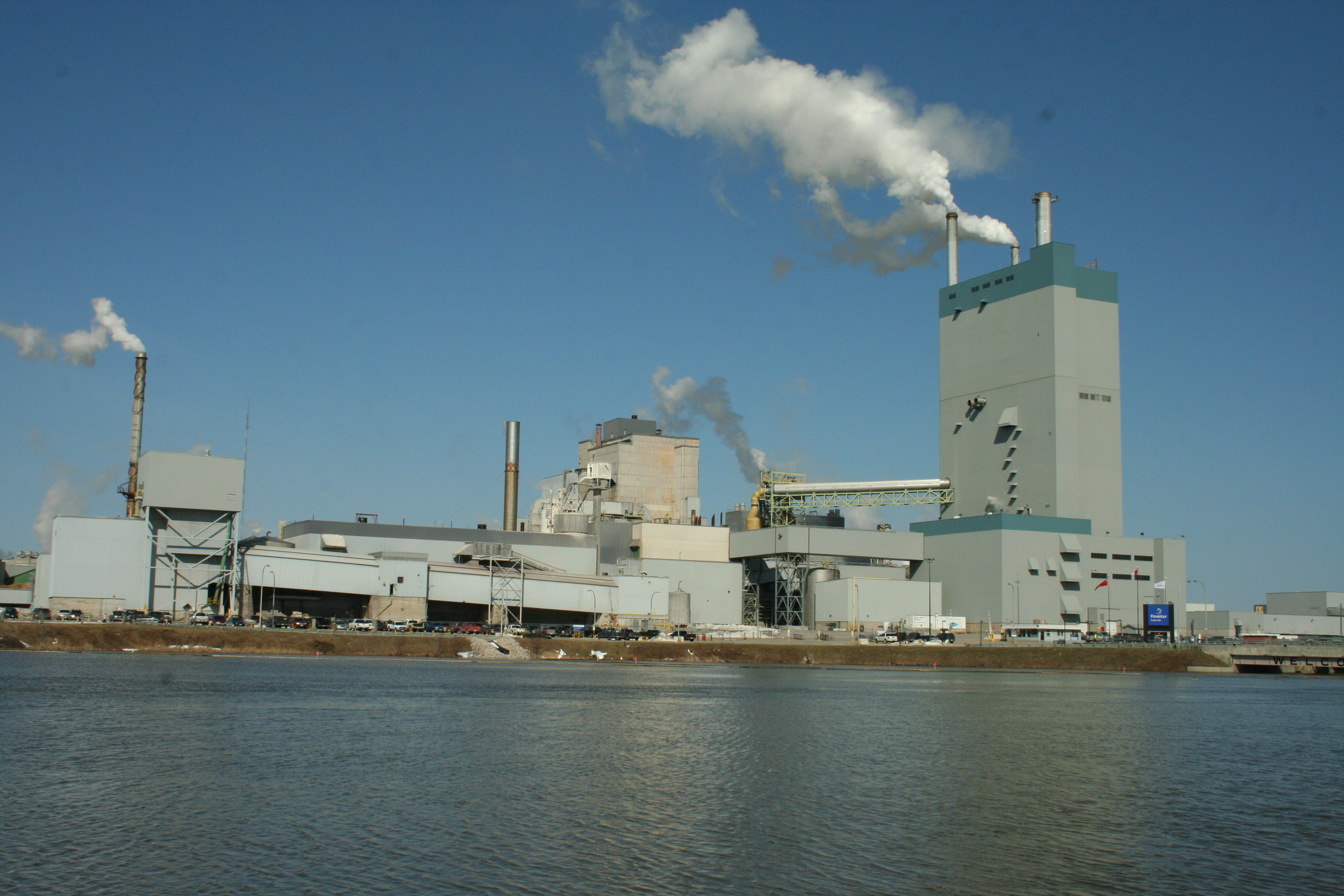
Dryden Mill

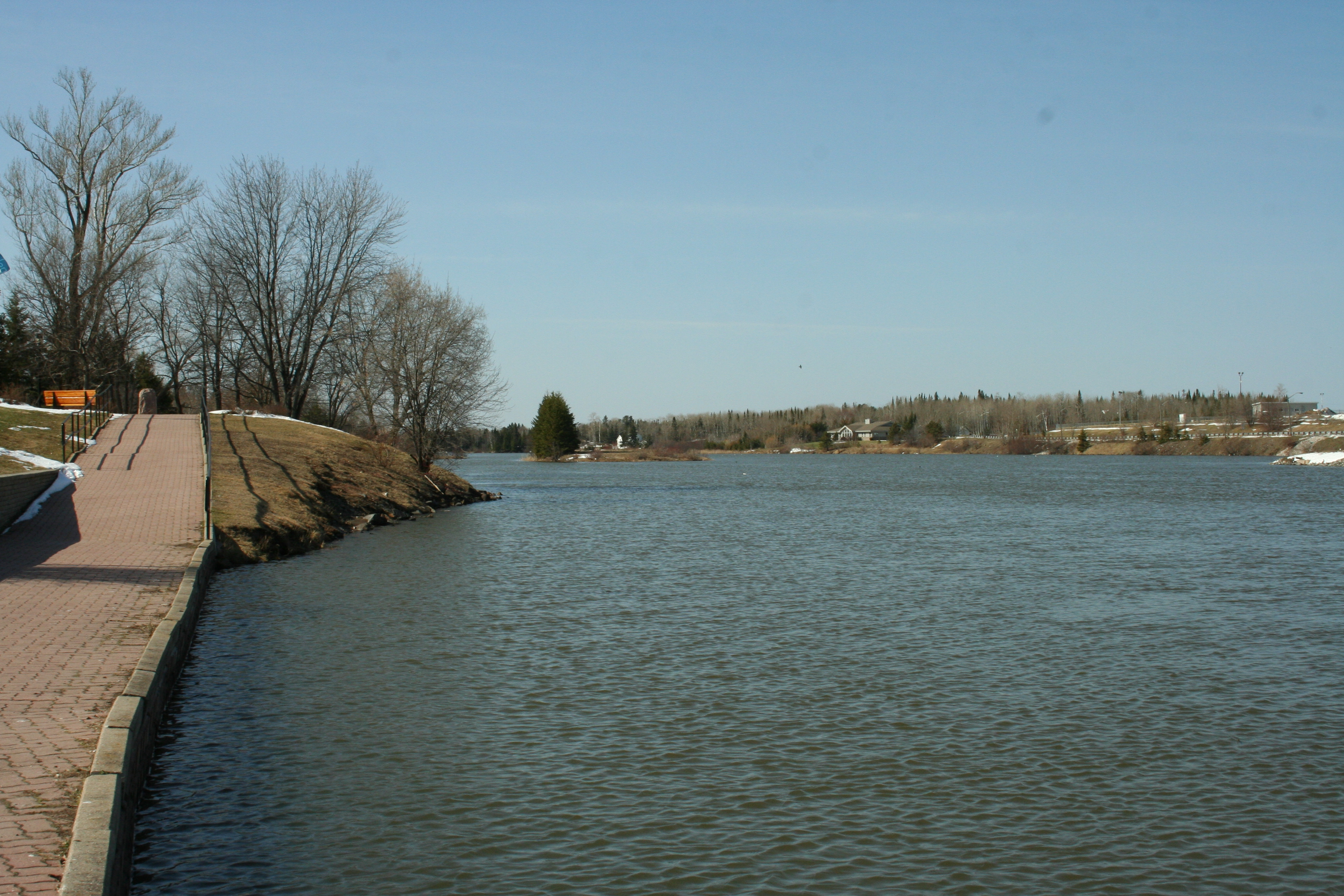
The Wabigoon River as it exits the Wabigoon Lake.

The mercury contamination of the Wabigoon River in Ontario Canada by a corporate subsidiary between 1962 and 1970 was "one of the worst cases of environmental poisoning in Canadian history." Reed sold the Dryden Mill to Great Lakes Forest Products in 1980. As of 2017, Grassy Narrows First Nation chief Simon Fobister stated that the river remained highly contaminated.

=== Academic journal prices ===
Reed Elsevier has been criticised for the high prices of its journals and services, especially those published by Elsevier. It has also supported SOPA, PIPA and the Research Works Act, although it no longer supports the last. Because of this, members of the scientific community have boycotted Elsevier journals. In January 2012, the boycott gained an online pledge and petition (The Cost of Knowledge) initiated by mathematician and Fields Medal recipient Sir Timothy Gowers. The movement has received support from noted science bloggers, such as biologist Jonathan Eisen. Between 2012 and February 2023, about 20,500 scientists signed The Cost of Knowledge boycott.

=== 2019 UC system negotiations ===
On 28 February 2019, following long negotiations, the University of California announced it would be terminating all subscriptions with Elsevier. On 16 March 2021, following further negotiations and significant changes including (i) universal open access to University of California research and (ii) containing the "excessively high costs" being charged by publishers, the university renewed its subscription.

=== Privacy ===
As a data broker Reed Elsevier collected, used, and sold data on millions of consumers. In 2005, a security breach occurred through a recently purchased subsidiary, Seisint, which allowed identity thieves to steal the records of at least 316,000 people. The database contained names, current and prior addresses, dates of birth, drivers license numbers and Social Security numbers, among other data obtained from credit reporting agencies and other sources. In 2008 the company settled an action taken against it by the Federal Trade Commission for multiple failures of security practice in how the data was stored and protected. The settlement required Reed Elsevier and Seisint to establish and maintain a comprehensive security program to protect nonpublic personal information.

=== Defence exhibitions ===
Between 2005 and 2007, members of the medical and scientific communities, which purchase and use many journals published by Reed Elsevier, agitated for the company to cut its links to the arms trade. Two UK academics, Tom Stafford of Sheffield University and Nick Gill, launched petitions calling for it to stop organising arms fairs. A subsidiary, Spearhead, organised defence shows, including an event where it was reported that cluster bombs and extremely powerful riot control equipment were offered for sale. In February 2007 Richard Smith, former editor of the British Medical Journal, published an editorial in the Journal of the Royal Society of Medicine arguing that Reed Elsevier's involvement in both the arms trade and medical publishing constituted a conflict of interest. Subsequently, in June the company announced that they would be exiting the defence exhibition business during the second half of the year.

=== Collaboration with U.S. Immigration and Customs Enforcement (ICE) ===
In November 2019, legal scholars and human rights activists called on RELX to cease work with U.S. Immigration and Customs Enforcement because their product LexisNexis directly contributes to the deportation of illegal immigrants.

=== Support for fossil fuel expansion ===
An article in The Guardian in February 2022 revealed that Elsevier products and services support expanding the production aims of the fossil fuel industry. The company disclosed that it is "not prepared to draw a line between the transition away from fossil fuels and the expansion of oil and gas extraction." In response, the Union of Concerned Scientists and Scientists for Global Responsibility launched a petition in 2022, and issued a response to the company's reply in 2023. UCS noted in a blog post that "Elsevier and RELX claimed to be focused on a transition to clean energy. Given the services Elsevier and RELX continue to provide, these claims are demonstrably false." Scientists for Global Responsibility also noted on their website that the company's "actions fall short of meeting the standards set in their own pledges" and pointed campaigners to the website of Climate Rights Coalition, which revealed such concerns had been raised by employees years prior.
