= Judith Hamilton =

Judith Hamilton is known for her community theatre work in Dryden, Ontario, Canada.

A member and part of the management team of the community theatre group Theatre 17, she is credited with reviving and leading the theatre, and has directed many of their productions. Since 2004, Theatre 17 has staged at least one show per year. Hamilton brought the community together to resurrect the theatre in 2005, producing Quilters.

In February 2014, the group performed Calendar Girls, a highly successful production raising money for the community's hospital. They staged Love, Loss, and What I Wore in January 2015. Calendar Girls was performed as a fundraiser for cancer care in the local hospital, and raised $20,000 between ticket sales and calendars that featured members of the cast. 2016 saw Dryden direct The Importance of Being Ernest with Theatre 17. In 2017, Hamilton directed Theatre 17's production of Neil Simon's Rumors and donated some proceeds to the local library.

Judith Hamilton is also involved with The Dryden Entertainment Series Under her direction the effort has received major grant support. Her involvement with the arts in the community has spanned many years, as she taught drama courses at Dryden High School and was teacher adviser for the Drama Club.

She has been highly influential with the arts in Dryden, and the community as a whole has highly benefited from her work.

She studied at the University of Waterloo, graduating in 1969.
