= Dryden High School =

Dryden High School may refer to:

- Dryden High School (Ontario) (Canada)
- Dryden High School (New York) (United States)
