= Swan Lake 29 =

- Indian reserve
- Swan Lake Indian Reserve No. 29
- Location within Ontario
- Coordinates: 50°03′N 94°53′W
- Country: Canada
- Province: Ontario
- District: Kenora
- First Nation: Wabaseemoong

Area
  - Land: 22.37 km^{2} (8.64 sq mi)

Swan Lake 29 is a First Nations reserve in Kenora District, Ontario. It is one of the reserves of the Wabaseemoong Independent Nations.
