= The Dryden Observer =

Canadian newspaper

The Dryden Observer was a weekly publication based in Dryden, Ontario, Canada, and was originally established as the Wabigoon Star in 1897.

The newspaper was published by Norwest Printing and Publishing Group, who acquired the paper from Alex Wilson Coldstream Ltd, its long-time owners (since 1940). It ceased publication in May 2019.
