= One Man Lake 29 =

- Indian reserve
- One Man Lake Indian Reserve No. 29
- Location within Ontario
- Coordinates: 50°21′N 94°45′W
- Country: Canada
- Province: Ontario
- District: Kenora
- First Nation: Wabaseemoong

Area
  - Land: 11.17 km^{2} (4.31 sq mi)

One Man Lake 29 is a First Nations reserve located on Umfreville Lake in Kenora District, Ontario. It is one of the reserves of the Wabaseemoong Independent Nations.
