= Grassy Narrows road blockade =

21st-century event in Canada

- Date: December 2, 2002 – present
- Location: Ontario Provincial Highway 671, near Slant Lake, Asubpeeschoseewagong First Nation
- Type: Road blockade
- Organized by: Asubpeeschoseewagong First Nation

The Grassy Narrows road blockade is an ongoing roadblock in Canada that started in 2002 to prevent clearcutting of timber on Asubpeeschoseewagong First Nation territory.

== History ==
The Grassy Narrows road blockade began on December 2, 2002 and prevents logging trucks from entering Asubpeeschoseewagong First Nation territory (also known as Grassy Narrows First Nation). Grassy Narrows is located in northwestern Ontario near the town of Kenora. The blockade is on Ontario Provincial Highway 671 near Slant Lake.

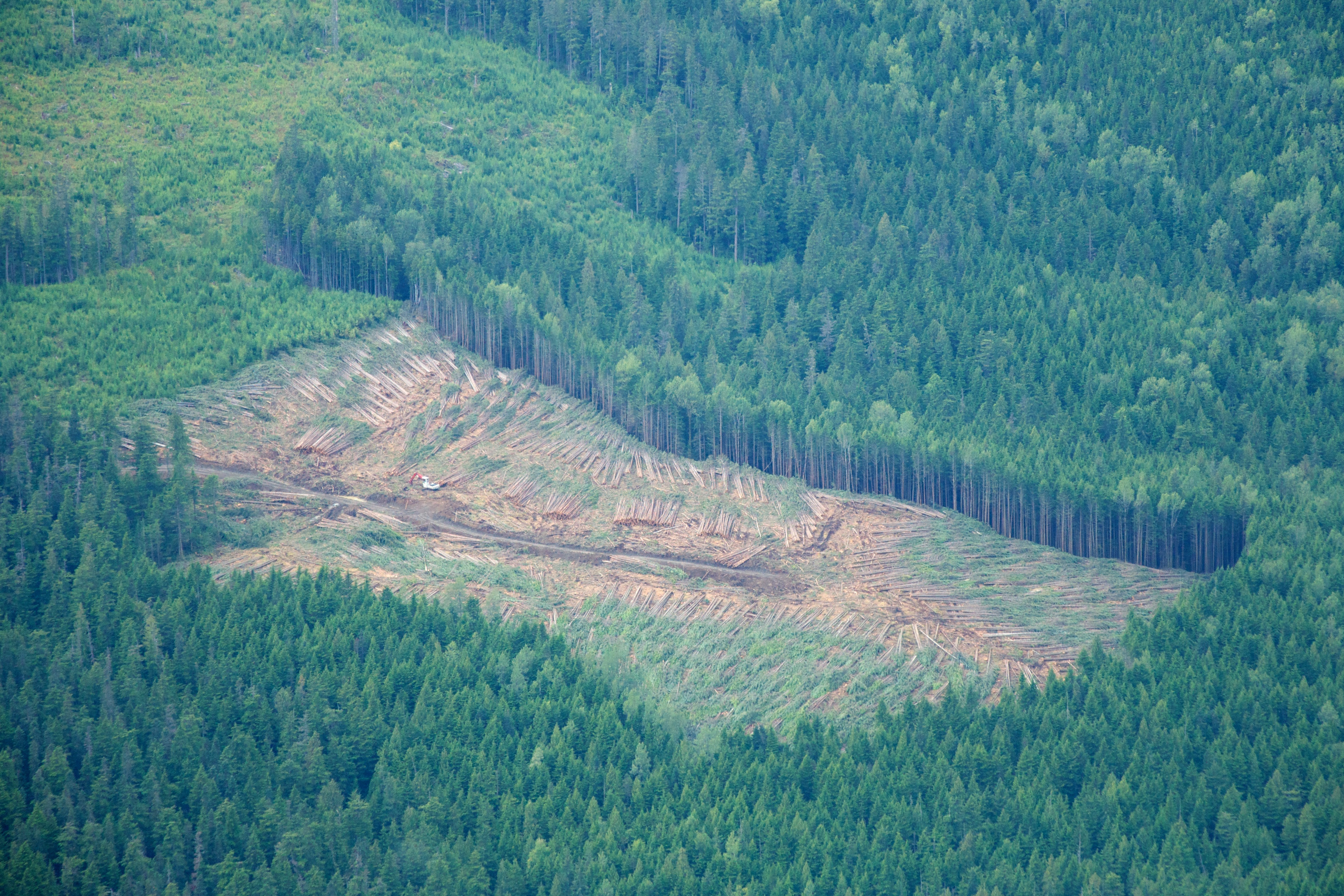
An example of clearcutting in Canada

Since the 1990s logging near the community had accelerated, prompting community members to act. Working with non-Indigenous environmentalists and human rights advocates, they began media campaigns to draw attention to their protest. Many people think the clearcutting is a clear violation of treaty rights and the sovereignty of the Anishinaabe nation.

The Grassy Narrow's chief and council aimed to stop the logging efforts by working within the federal system and using the Indian Act. In 2008, the Ontario government began negotiating a resolution to the conflict, which ended the license for logging companies. In 2014, the provincial government stated they would monitor logging companies to make sure they adhered to the new proposed rules. However, many in the community remain skeptical.

== Background ==
In 1873, the Anishinaabe people negotiated Treaty 3 with the Government of Canada. The Anishinaabe people now vigorously contest the terms of this treaty since they disagree with Canadian government about its interpretation and assumptions. When the treaty was agreed on, the government of Canada was seeking to expand farther west for more agricultural settlements and the treaty was seen as a way to secure and create a route through northwestern Ontario and further Canadian nation building. Anishinaabe leaders saw the treaty as a peace-and-friendship agreement. According to oral histories and the unofficial versions of Treaty 3, the Anishinaabe people wanted to share the land to ensure its survival but not surrender it. The Government of Canada contests this, stating the Anishinaabe surrendered their right to the land once the treaty was signed.

== Impacts on environmental justice ==
During the long history of the ongoing feud between the Grassy Narrows First Nation (GNFN) and the Government of Canada surrounding the prevention of logging within GNFN territory, environmental justice and land rights claims have been the focal point of contention. The disregard by the Government of Canada and subsidiary commercial logging companies for the territory belonging to the GNFN exposed the state of the relationship between Indigenous communities and other legislative powers, and the clear injustice that was prevalent. The use of procedural justice when creating this "claimed space" and subsequent blockade of the newly constructed logging road brought the issue into the spotlight, gaining the attention of other environmental activist groups. This undermined what is often referred to as "slow violence", a common issue in Indigenous communities that do not often gain enough recognition and media attention. The blockade accumulated so much recognition that it became "a hub of anticlearcutting activism, cultural revitalization, and political self-determination," and set the precedent for future activism on environmental justice for Indigenous communities. By highlighting these issues of governance, land rights and preventing environmental degradation of indigenous land, "distributive justice", or how justice should be allocated, became an important topic of conversation when coming to an agreeable solution to many environmental injustice instances between First Nation and non-First Nations communities alike.

== See also ==
- Mercury contamination in Grassy Narrows
