= Dryden High School (Dryden, Ontario) =

Location
- 79 Casimir Avenue; Dryden, Ontario, P8N 2H4; Canada; 49.781562°N 92.83047°W

Information
- School type: Public high school
- Motto: Scientia Prevalabit (Knowledge will Prevail)
- Founded: 1935
- School board: Keewatin-Patricia District School Board
- Principal: Richard Hodgkinson
- Grades: 9 to 12
- Enrollment: approx. 830 (December 2009)
- Language: English
- Colours: Blue and Gold
- Mascot: Sam the Eagle
- Team name: Eagles
- Website: dhseagles.kpdsb.on.ca

Dryden High School (2009 population 830) is a composite secondary school situated in Dryden, Ontario, Canada.

== Activities ==
Dryden High School runs a competitive athletics program as part of the Northwestern Ontario Secondary School Athletics league (NorWOSSA). Dryden High School currently has teams in Hockey, Volleyball, Basketball, Soccer, Football, Wrestling, Cheerleading, Track and Field, Cross Country Running and Cross Country Skiing. In the past, Dryden High School has run a Curling team.

Dryden High School has a popular Music program, with student Jazz, Concert and sometimes Pit (musical) bands.

The Drama Association puts on yearly productions. This year's production was Disney's High School Musical. The DA (Drama Association), normally referred to as the Drama Club, is the oldest of the Fine Arts clubs. Judith Hamilton directed many of the club's productions, which have included, Fiddler on the Roof, The Music Man, and Back to the 80s.

DHS also has a Visual Arts Association, where students learn more about art.

The Drama, Music, and Visual Arts Associations are collectively known as the Fine Arts Council.

== Notable alumni ==
NHL Player Chris Pronger attended DHS and played on the DHS Eagles hockey team.

== History ==
The City of Dryden offered secondary education as early as 1905, though on an informal basis. Dryden Continuation School (DCS) came into existence in 1912 and offered Second Class Matriculation (equivalent to Grade 12). In 1935, DCS evolved to a high school (DHS) when it offered First Class Matriculation (equivalent to Grade 13).

DHS was the first high school in Canada to offer a course in Forestry.

Dryden High School has the longest running industry supported conservation camp in Canada. Started in 1957, the outdoor workshop/classroom introduces students to conservation concepts and land use. The camp is presented by high school teachers, people from industry and employees of the Ministry of Natural Resources.

== Athletics ==
Dryden High School has a rich sporting history with achievements at the local and provincial level.

List Dryden High School NorWOSSA championships:

Sport	NorWOSSA Championships	
Senior boys volleyball (17)	1983, 1984, 1986, 1987, 1992, 1993, 1994, 1996, 2001, 2003, 2005*, 2008, 2010, 2011, 2012, 2013, 2014	* 'AA' OFSAA gold medal winners
Senior girls volleyball (25)	1968, 1971, 1984, 1985, 1986, 1987, 1988, 1989, 1990, 1991, 1995, 1996, 2002, 2003, 2004, 2005, 2006, 2007, 2008, 2009, 2010, 2011, 2012, 2013, 2014, 2015	
Junior Boys volleyball (19)	1983, 1984, 1985, 1987, 1988, 1990, 1991, 1993, 1996, 2003, 2004, 2006, 2007, 2008, 2009, 2011, 2012, 2013, 2014	
Junior Girls volleyball (19)	1983, 1984, 1985, 1987, 1988, 1989, 1990, 1992, 1995, 2000, 2004, 2005, 2006, 2007, 2008, 2009, 2010, 2011, 2014, 2017	
Senior boys basketball (18)	1962, 1964, 1969, 1970, 1975, 1976, 1970, 1975, 1976, 1984, 1985, 1986, 1987, 1988, 1989, 1994, 2006, 2014, 2015	
Senior girls basketball (18)	: 1972, 1973, 1975, 1976, 1977, 1983, 1985, 1986, 1988, 1989, 1993, 1994, 1995, 2001, 2008, 2010, 2011, 2015	
Junior boys basketball (15)	1966, 1967, 1973, 1975, 1977, 1981, 1982, 1983, 1984, 1985, 1994, 2002, 2003, 2004, 2011, 2015	
Junior girls basketball (17)	: 1972, 1974, 1976, 1977, 1978, 1980, 1981, 1982, 1983, 1984, 1985, 1999, 2002, 2005, 2007, 2008, 2014	
Boys soccer (8)	1974, 1983, 1990, 1991, 1992, 1998, 2002, 2003, 2010	
Girls soccer (5)	1993, 1996, 2005, 2006, 2007	
Boys hockey(8)	1974, 1983, 1990, 1991, 1992, 1998, 2002, 2003	
Girls hockey(5)	2005, 2006, 2007, 2009, 2010, 2023	
Cheerleading (5)	: 1988, 1989, 1991, 2003, 2004	

== See also ==
- Education in Ontario
- List of secondary schools in Ontario
