= Jones, Ontario =

Jones
- Location of Jones in Ontario
- Coordinates: 49°58′33″N 94°05′05″W
- Country: Canada
- Province: Ontario
- Region: Northwestern Ontario
- District: Kenora
- Part: Kenora, Unorganized
- Elevation: 396 m (1,299 ft)
- Time zone: UTC-6 (Central Time Zone)
  - Summer (DST): UTC-5 (Central Time Zone)
- Postal code FSA: P0X
- Area code: 807

Jones is an unincorporated place in Unorganized Kenora District in northwestern Ontario, Canada.

It lies on the Canadian National Railway transcontinental main line, between Farlane to the west and Favel to the east, and is passed but not served by Via Rail transcontinental Canadian trains. Jones is also on Ontario Highway 671, which heads southwest to the city of Kenora.
