= Wabaseemoong =

- Indian reserve
- Wabaseemoong Indian Reserve
- Location within Ontario
- Coordinates: 50°10′N 94°56′W
- Country: Canada
- Province: Ontario
- District: Kenora
- First Nation: Wabaseemoong

Area
  - Land: 75.55 km^{2} (29.17 sq mi)

Population (2011)
  - Total: 832
  - Density: 11/km^{2} (28/sq mi)

Wabaseemoong is a First Nation reserve of the Wabaseemoong Independent Nations. It is in Kenora District, Ontario, Canada, close to the border with Manitoba. It used to be known as Islington 29.
