= Favel, Ontario =

Favel
- Location of Favel in Ontario
- Coordinates: 49°59′28″N 93°56′56″W
- Country: Canada
- Province: Ontario
- Region: Northwestern Ontario
- District: Kenora
- Part: Kenora, Unorganized
- Elevation: 377 m (1,237 ft)
- Time zone: UTC-6 (Central Time Zone)
  - Summer (DST): UTC-5 (Central Time Zone)
- Postal code FSA: P0X
- Area code: 807

Favel is an unincorporated place on Favel Lake on the Canyon River in Unorganized Kenora District in northwestern Ontario, Canada.

It lies on the Canadian National Railway transcontinental main line, between Jones to the west and Canyon to the east, and is passed but not served by Via Rail transcontinental Canadian trains.
