= Dryden, Ontario =

Dryden
- City (single-tier)
- City of Dryden
- Aerial view of Dryden (2026)

- Seal

- Location in Ontario
- Coordinates: 49°47′N 92°50′W
- Country: Canada
- Province: Ontario
- District: Kenora
- Settled: 1895
- Incorporated: 1910 (town)
- Incorporated: 1998 (city)

Government
  - Mayor: Jack B. Harrison
  - Governing Body: Dryden Council
  - MP: Eric Melillo
  - MPP: Greg Rickford

Area
  - Land: 65.58 km^{2} (25.32 sq mi)
  - Urban: 6.53 km^{2} (2.52 sq mi)
- Elevation: 412.7 m (1,354 ft)

Population (2021)
  - Total: 7,388
  - Density: 112.7/km^{2} (292/sq mi)
  - Urban: 5,355
  - Urban density: 820.4/km^{2} (2,125/sq mi)
- Time zone: UTC-6 (CST)
  - Summer (DST): UTC-5 (CDT)
- Forward sortation area: P8N
- Area code: 807
- Website: www.dryden.ca

Dryden is the second-largest city in the Kenora District of northwestern Ontario, Canada, located on Wabigoon Lake. It is the least populous community in Ontario incorporated as a city. The City of Dryden had a population of 7,388 and its population centre (urban area) had a population of 5,355 in 2021.

Dryden was incorporated as a town in 1910 and as a city in 1998. The main industries in Dryden include manufacturing (particularly pulp and paper), renewable energy (including bioenergy and solar energy), and service. Dryden is located on Ontario's Highway 17, which forms part of the Trans-Canada Highway. It is situated halfway between the larger cities of Winnipeg and Thunder Bay.

== History ==
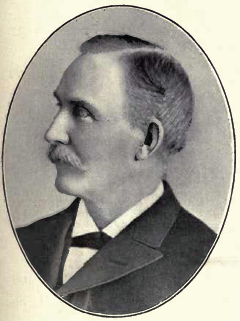
The city is named for John Dryden

Before settlement by Europeans, the Dryden area was inhabited by the Anishinaabe. They used the shore by the Wabigoon River as a camping site, calling it Paawidigong ("the place of rapids" in Ojibwe). The settlement was founded as an agricultural community by John Dryden, Ontario's Minister of Agriculture in 1895. While his train was stopped at what was then known as Barclay Tank to re-water, he noticed clover growing and decided to found an experimental farm the following year. The farm's success brought settlers from southern Ontario and the community came to be known as New Prospect. In 1886, gold was discovered near the area, also attracting people. In 1897, the community was renamed to Dryden to honour the minister of agriculture. It incorporated as a town in 1910 and as a city in 1998 after merging with the neighbouring township of Barclay.

One of the earliest industries in the area was pulp and paper. A paper mill was built in the town in 1910 because of the abundance of wood suitable for kraft pulping as well as energy from the Wabigoon River. The town came into national consciousness because of mercury contamination. In the 1970s, it became known that the Dryden pulp and paper operations discharged ten tons of mercury directly into the Wabigoon River over a span of eight years. The mercury caused persistent environmental damage, poisoned river systems and lakes, and led to members of the Grassy Narrows community suffering severe mercury poisoning known as Minamata disease.

The town was also the site of the March 10, 1989 crash of Air Ontario Flight 1363 from Thunder Bay to Winnipeg, which killed 24 people.

== Geography ==
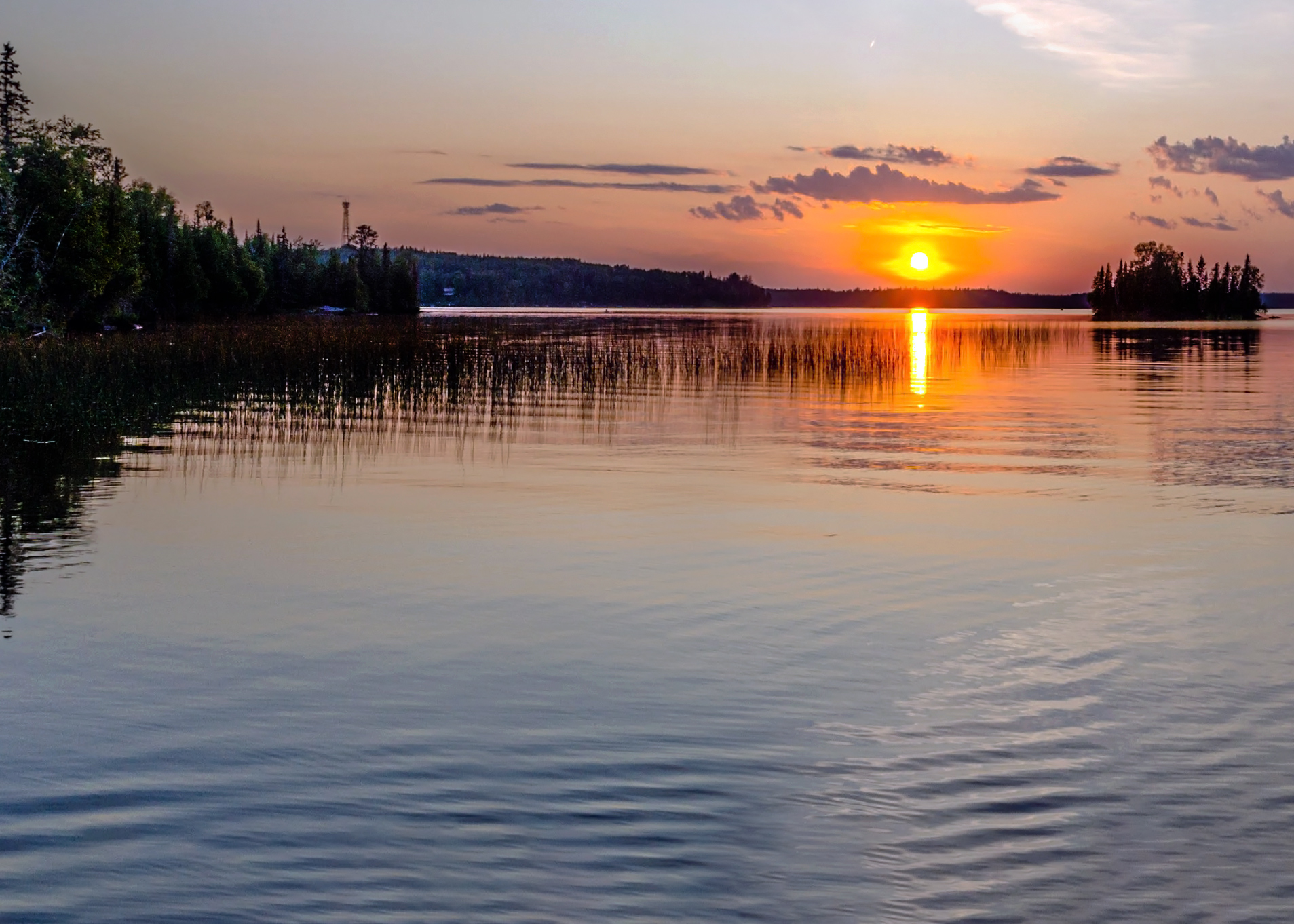
Thunder Lake, in Aaron Provincial Park

Dryden is located on the Wabigoon River and Wabigoon Lake in northwestern Ontario. It borders Thunder Lake and Aaron Provincial Park on the east, and the smaller Milanese's Lakes are also located within the city. Dryden is located 340 kilometres (210 miles) northwest of Thunder Bay. Nearby communities include Wabigoon, Vermilion Bay, Kenora, and Sioux Lookout. Dryden is also near the Eagle Lake First Nation.

Along with most of the rest of Ontario west of 90° West, Dryden is in the Central Time Zone and observes daylight saving time.

=== Climate ===
Dryden experiences a humid continental climate (Dfb) with short, warm summers, and long, cold winters. The highest temperature ever recorded in Dryden was 39.4 °C (103 °F) on 11 July 1936. The coldest temperature ever recorded was −46.7 °C (−52 °F) on 11 February 1914. Compared to the rest of the province, the annual temperature range is wider and precipitation is more concentrated in the summer.

Climate data for Dryden Regional Airport, 1981–2010 normals, extremes 1914–present (Note: Extreme high and low temperatures were recorded at Dryden from January 1914 to December 1969 and at Dryden Airport from January 1970 to present.)
Month	Jan	Feb	Mar	Apr	May	Jun	Jul	Aug	Sep	Oct	Nov	Dec	Year
Record high °C (°F)	6.7 (44.1)	11.1 (52.0)	24.3 (75.7)	30.6 (87.1)	34.4 (93.9)	37.5 (99.5)	39.4 (102.9)	35.6 (96.1)	34.4 (93.9)	26.2 (79.2)	20.6 (69.1)	8.9 (48.0)	39.4 (102.9)
Mean daily maximum °C (°F)	−11.6 (11.1)	−7.3 (18.9)	−0.1 (31.8)	8.8 (47.8)	16.9 (62.4)	21.7 (71.1)	24.3 (75.7)	23.1 (73.6)	16.5 (61.7)	8.2 (46.8)	−1.6 (29.1)	−9.1 (15.6)	7.5 (45.5)
Daily mean °C (°F)	−16.8 (1.8)	−12.7 (9.1)	−5.8 (21.6)	3.0 (37.4)	10.8 (51.4)	16.2 (61.2)	18.9 (66.0)	17.8 (64.0)	11.7 (53.1)	4.2 (39.6)	−5.2 (22.6)	−13.5 (7.7)	2.4 (36.3)
Mean daily minimum °C (°F)	−21.9 (−7.4)	−18.1 (−0.6)	−11.5 (11.3)	−2.8 (27.0)	4.7 (40.5)	10.5 (50.9)	13.4 (56.1)	12.4 (54.3)	6.8 (44.2)	0.3 (32.5)	−8.8 (16.2)	−17.8 (0.0)	−2.7 (27.1)
Record low °C (°F)	−46.1 (−51.0)	−46.7 (−52.1)	−41.1 (−42.0)	−32.7 (−26.9)	−12.8 (9.0)	−3.3 (26.1)	1.1 (34.0)	−1.1 (30.0)	−6.1 (21.0)	−17.2 (1.0)	−36.1 (−33.0)	−42.2 (−44.0)	−46.7 (−52.1)
Average precipitation mm (inches)	26.5 (1.04)	20.0 (0.79)	29.9 (1.18)	39.6 (1.56)	73.4 (2.89)	115.2 (4.54)	103.1 (4.06)	83.7 (3.30)	88.9 (3.50)	63.6 (2.50)	46.7 (1.84)	29.1 (1.15)	719.7 (28.33)
Average rainfall mm (inches)	0.2 (0.01)	2.1 (0.08)	6.7 (0.26)	24.7 (0.97)	69.2 (2.72)	115.2 (4.54)	103.1 (4.06)	83.5 (3.29)	87.7 (3.45)	49.2 (1.94)	13.0 (0.51)	1.2 (0.05)	555.8 (21.88)
Average snowfall cm (inches)	30.1 (11.9)	19.9 (7.8)	25.1 (9.9)	13.9 (5.5)	3.4 (1.3)	0.0 (0.0)	0.0 (0.0)	0.0 (0.0)	1.1 (0.4)	14.6 (5.7)	35.3 (13.9)	31.1 (12.2)	174.7 (68.8)
Average relative humidity (%) (at 15:00 LST)	75.5	69.1	59.3	46.5	45.6	51.5	53.5	54.6	60.3	66.4	75.7	78.5	61.4
Source: Environment Canada

== Demographics ==
In the 2021 Census of Population conducted by Statistics Canada, Dryden had a population of 7,388 living in 3,314 of its 3,574 total private dwellings, a change of −4.7% from its 2016 population of 7,749. With a land area of 65.58 km^{2} (25.32 sq mi), it had a population density of 112.7/km^{2} (291.8/sq mi) in 2021.

The population centre, or urban area, of Dryden had a population of 5,355 in the 2021 census, a 4.3 percent decrease from 2016. The median value of dwellings in the urban area is CA$200,000, significantly lower than the national median of $472,000. The median household income (after-tax) in Dryden is $67,000, almost on par with the national average at $73,000.

The city's population peaked at 8,198 measured in the 2001 Canadian Census and is slowly declining due to lack of support for an aging population and high taxes. 21% of the population was 65 years and over as of the 2016 census compared to 16.7% in the entirely of Ontario. The median age of 46.2 was nearly 5 years older than the provincial median of 41.3.

In 2016, approximately 1,465 residents (19.3%) considered themselves to have an Aboriginal identity. 220 residents (2.9%) belonged to a visible minority group (i.e. people who are not Aboriginal and "non-Caucasian in race or non-white in colour"). The largest group was Filipino, representing about 80 residents (1% of the population).

In the 2011 National Household Survey, 4,970 residents (66.8% of the respondents) stated that they were Christian, while 2,455 (33.0%) did not affiliate with any religion. 0.1% identified as Buddhist, while a further 0.1% practised traditional Aboriginal spirituality.

Canada census – Dryden community profile

	2021	2016	2011
Population	7,388 (-4.7% from 2016)	7,749 (1.7% from 2011)	7,617 (-7.1% from 2006)
Land area	65.58 km^{2} (25.32 sq mi)	66.19 km^{2} (25.56 sq mi)	65.84 km^{2} (25.42 sq mi)
Population density	112.7/km^{2} (292/sq mi)	117.1/km^{2} (303/sq mi)	115.7/km^{2} (300/sq mi)
Median age	48.0 (M: 47.2, F: 48.8)	46.2 (M: 45.5, F: 46.7)	45.0 (M: 44.7, F: 45.4)
Private dwellings	3,574 (total) 3,314 (occupied)	3,541 (total)	3,417 (total)
Median household income	$82,000	$58,624	$54,577

References: 2021 2016 2011

Historical census populations – Dryden, Ontario

Year	Pop.	±%
1901	140	—
1911	715	+410.7%
1921	1,019	+42.5%
1931	1,326	+30.1%
1941	1,641	+23.8%
1951	2,627	+60.1%

Year	Pop.	±%
1961	5,728	+118.0%
1971	6,939	+21.1%
1981	6,640	−4.3%
1991	6,505	−2.0%
1996	6,711	+3.2%
2001	8,198	+22.2%

Year	Pop.	±%
2006	8,195	−0.0%
2011	7,617	−7.1%
2016	7,749	+1.7%
2021	7,388	−4.7%

Population figures for 2001 onwards are for the amalgamated City of Dryden. Population figures before 2001 are for the former Town of Dryden.
Source: Statistics Canada

== Economy ==
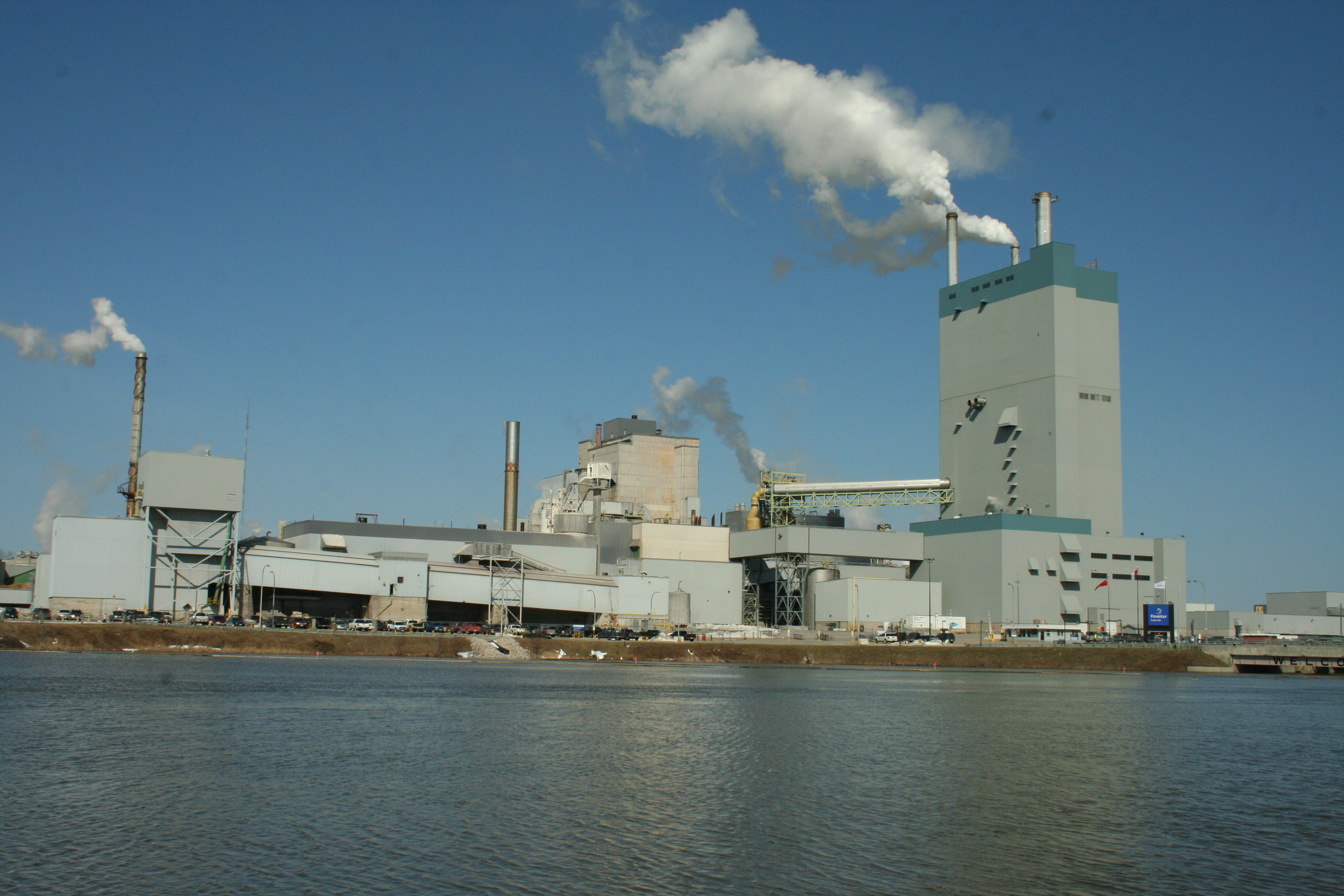
Dryden Mill in 2008

The Dryden pulp mill, also known as the Reed Mill, is a paper and pulp mill in Dryden, Ontario. During the 1960s and 70s, mercury poisoning from the mill caused one of Canada's worst environmental disasters: Dryden Chemicals Ltd dumped mercury into the English-Wabigoon River, upstream of Grassy Narrows First Nation, poisoning the fish which were their staple food. Members of the Grassy Narrows and the Whitedog communities downstream from the mill suffered severe mercury poisoning. Additionally, the mill was the subject of a W5 investigative report, published in 2021, into claims that workers involved in the Recovery Boiler #4 (RB4) project were intentionally exposed to toxic fumes by their employer during its construction between 2002 and 2004. As of 2024, the RB4 project is also the subject of an ongoing occupational disease investigation by Occupational Health Clinics for Ontario Workers (OHCOW).

The first iteration of the mill was initially built by Charles and Grant Gordon in 1909 on the west side of the Wabigoon River From the early twentieth century to the twenty-first century, the forest industry has played a significant role in Dryden's economy.

In 2019, the Supreme Court of Canada ruled that Weyerhaeuser Company and Resolute Forest Products—previously known as Abitibi-Consolidated—are responsible for remediating the mercury contamination. The environmental poisoning continues to cause significant health problems for the First Nations communities downstream. The Government of Canada is building a $20 million clinic to treat the First Nations "suffering from mercury poisoning".

Since a US$520 million purchase of the mill by Domtar from Weyerhaeuser, in 2007 the mill has produced Northern Bleached Softwood Kraft pulp product.

== Arts and culture ==
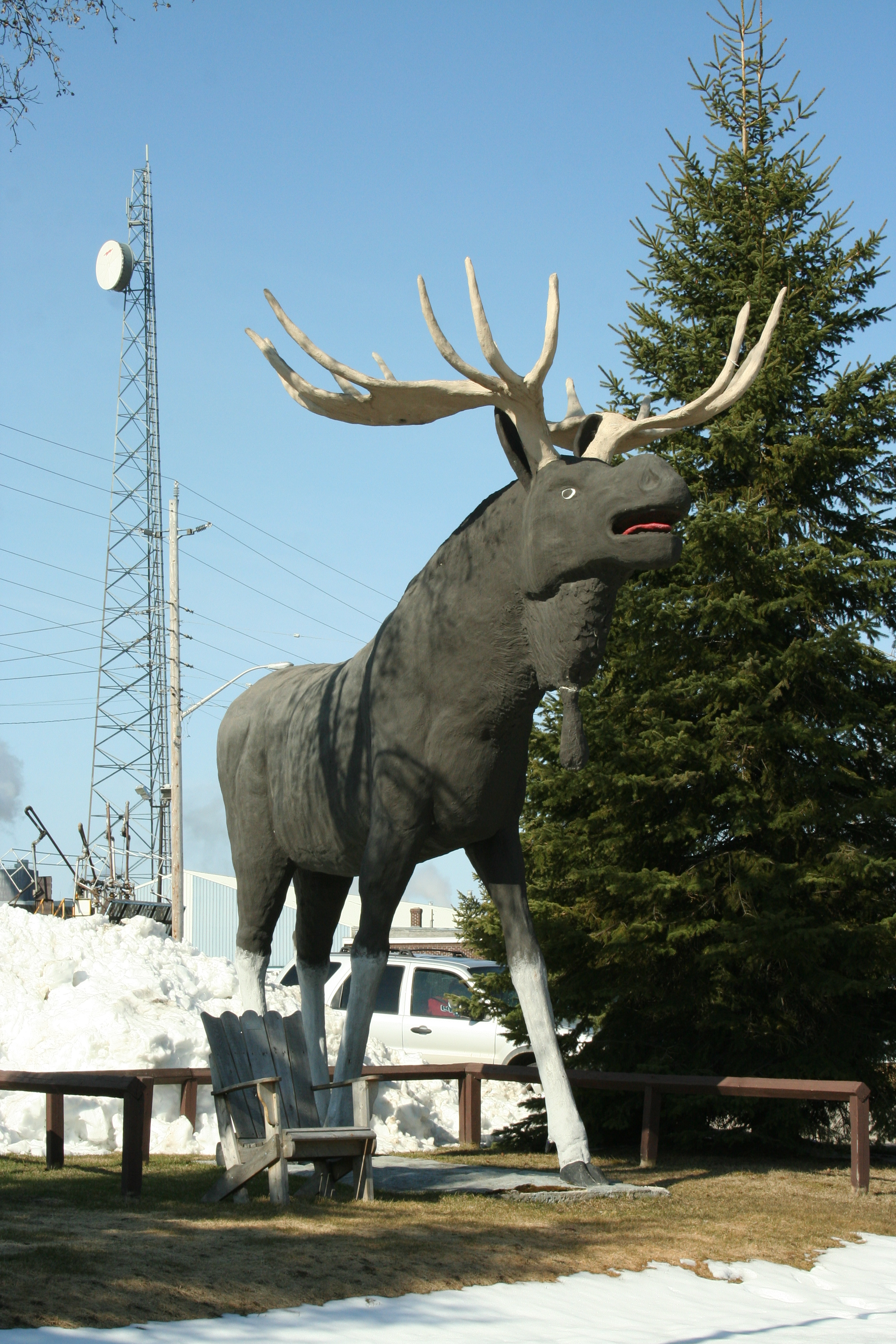
"Max the Moose"

Dryden is home to the 5.6-metre (18 ft) tall "Max the Moose" statue on the Trans-Canada Highway, which has been described as the "mascot" of the city. It was built in 1962, out of a metal frame and concrete plaster.

Several annual music concerts are held featuring local musicians. "Come Together" is an annual December 27 or 28th concert, and "Kickin' Country" is a mid April country show. Both featuring local acts. The "Blue Moon Festival" is a daylong event that is held on or near a blue moon calendar event in the summer months.

Dryden is home to a variety of arts groups. "Theatre 17" is a community theatre group under the direction of Ted Mitchell that stages theatrical productions, including Blithe Spirit. The DRAC (Dryden Regional Arts Council) is an artists group that organizes yearly art tours, art shows and also operates a retail store known as Naked North Art Gallery. The Dryden Community Band is a group of musicians who perform under conductor Ryan Graham.

== Government ==
Dryden is currently part of the provincial electoral district of Kenora—Rainy River. Kenora—Rainy River's Member of Provincial Parliament has been Greg Rickford, a member of the Progressive Conservative Party of Ontario, since 2018. He was preceded by Sarah Campbell and Howard Hampton, both of the New Democratic Party. Federally, the city is part of the Kenora riding, which has been represented by Eric Melillo, a Conservative, since 2019. He was preceded by the Liberal Bob Nault and the aforementioned Greg Rickford.

The city council is composed of six councillors and a mayor. As with the rest of Ontario, municipal elections occur every 4 years. Currently, Dryden's mayor is Greg Wilson, elected 2018. Previous mayors of Dryden have included Craig Nuttall (elected in 2010 and 2014), Anne Krassilowsky (elected in 2002 and 2006), and Roger Valley in the 1990s.

== Infrastructure and services ==
The city is served by Dryden Regional Airport. The Dryden Water Aerodrome is located within the city limits, on Wabigoon Lake.

Dryden is located on Ontario Highway 17, part of the Trans-Canada Highway, between Winnipeg and Thunder Bay. Several secondary highways pass through or near the city:

- Highway 502, with northern terminus just west of Dryden and southern terminous at Highway 11 near Fort Frances
- Highway 594, with eastern terminus at Dryden, connecting to Eagle River and Highway 17
- Highway 601, providing access to Dryden Regional Airport
- Highway 665, with southern terminus just north of Dryden, linking to Richan

The Dryden Regional Health Centre is a small hospital in Dryden, founded in 1952. It employs 300 staff and volunteers.

The Dryden Fire Service, a volunteer fire department, operates out of two fire stations and responds to about 250 incidents annually. It was established in 1908 with Alex Kennedy as Fire Chief. They also raise public awareness about fire safety. The service comprises five full-time staff and around forty volunteers. The City of Dryden also operates a landfill and recycling facility.

== Education ==
Dryden is within the jurisdiction of the Keewatin-Patricia District School Board. It is home to Dryden High School, a secondary school, as well as New Prospect Public School and Open Roads Public School, both elementary schools.

St. Joseph's School, a catholic school of the Northwest Catholic District School Board, is also in Dryden. École catholique de l'Enfant-Jésus of the Conseil scolaire de district catholique des Aurores boréales is a public Catholic francophone school in Dryden. In regards to secular French public education, Dryden is in the Conseil scolaire de district du Grand Nord de l'Ontario (CSPGNO).

Along with several other Northwest Ontarian communities, Dryden is home to a campus of Confederation College, whose main campus is in Thunder Bay.

== Media ==
Dryden is currently served by several radio stations, including:

- 92.7 FM - CKDR, adult contemporary
- 100.9 FM - CBQH, CBC Radio One, repeats CBQT-FM Thunder Bay
- 102.7 FM - CKSB-6, Ici Radio-Canada Première, repeats CKSB-10-FM Winnipeg
- 104.5 FM - CKQV-1, classic hits, repeats CKQV-FM Vermilion Bay, brands itself as Q104

Dryden previously had a community newspaper, The Dryden Observer, originally known as the Wabigoon Star, but it stopped publishing in 2019. The mayor of Dryden noted that the newspaper had provided a local sense of identity. CKQV operates an online local news source called DrydenNow, and CKDR also has a news division.

== Notable people ==
- Lynn Beyak (born 1949), former Canadian Senator
- Molly Bolin (born 1957), former professional basketball player
- Wayne Muloin (born 1941), former professional ice hockey player
- Patricia O'Callaghan (born 1970), opera singer
- Dennis Owchar (born 1953), former professional ice hockey player
- Chris Pronger (born 1974), former professional ice hockey player, 2000 Hart Trophy and Norris Trophy winner, 2006-2007 Stanley Cup champion, 2015 Hockey Hall of Fame inductee and brother of Sean Pronger
- Sean Pronger (born 1972), former professional ice hockey player and brother of Chris Pronger
- Roger Valley (born 1957), former mayor of Dryden and former member of the House of Commons of Canada
- Bill Salonen (1935-2025), former mayor of Dryden (1992-1997) and sport executive

== See also ==
- Mercury contamination in Grassy Narrows
