= Lake Rogers Park =

Park in Odessa, Florida

Coordinates: 28.110°N 82.587°W

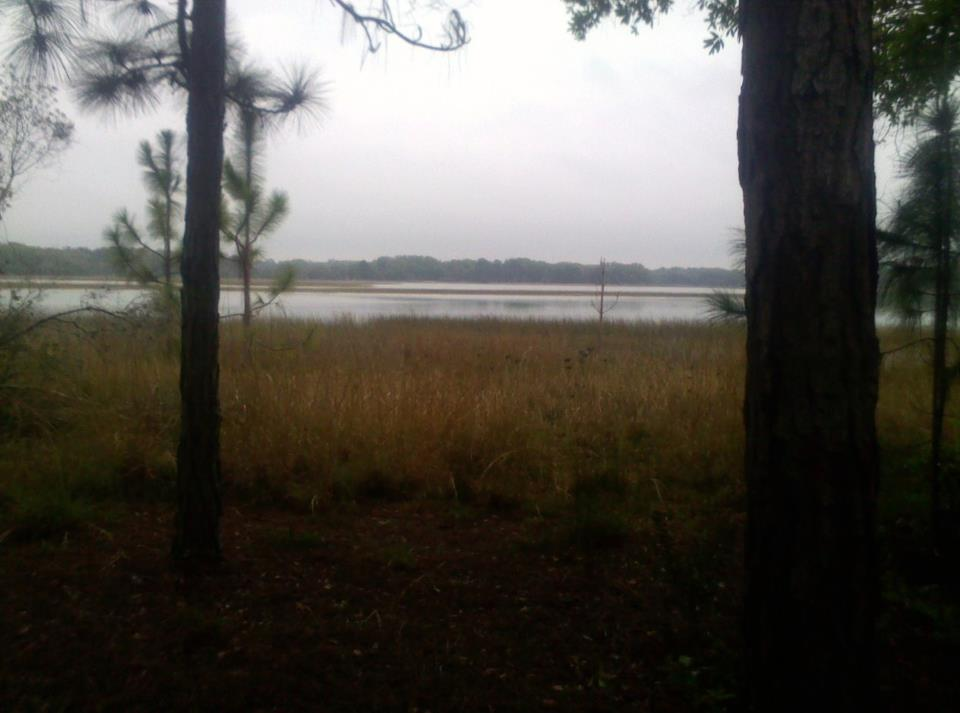
- View of Lake Rogers from the trail

- Location within Florida Location within the United States
- Location: Lake Rogers Park, 9010 North Mobley Road, Odessa, Florida 33556 Hillsborough County, Florida, United States
- Nearest city: Odessa, Florida
- Area: 272 acres (1.10 km^{2})
- Open: 1999
- Website: www.hillsboroughcounty.org/en/locations/lake-rogers-conservation-park

Lake Rogers Park is a 272-acre (110 ha) park and preserve with a 2.25-mile (3.62 km) trail in Odessa, Florida.

== Nature ==
The area includes pine flatwoods and oak hammocks.

The trail beds include sand, grass, dirt, and leaf litter. The park is accessible from a parking area at 9010 North Mobley Road, west of Gunn Highway.

There are areas for fishing (including catfish and catch-and-release for bass) and areas for canoe/ kayak launching. An offshoot trail leads to an overlook on neighboring Raleigh Lake.

The lakes provide a foraging habitat for wading birds, bald eagles, and osprey. Other animals include raccoons, opossum, and otter.

Breeding birds in the park include great crested flycatchers, northern parulas, and pine warblers.

== Features ==
There are several benches, picnic areas, grills, side trails, and a nature trail. Signage highlights some of the plant and animal inhabitants.

The main trail is the Red Trail, which encircles the lake most closely. Side trails include the Blue Trail, which also encircles the lake but less closely, and the Green Trail, which goes for approximately a mile on the northern and eastern boundaries of the park before connecting back to the other trails.

== History ==
In 1987 the City of St. Petersburg leased the land to Hillsborough County for "passive natural resource-based recreation". However, the park did not open until 1999, when the Hillsborough County Commissioners provided the park with an operating budget. The official opening was in March 2000.

== Parking ==
As of 2020, there is a charge of $2 per vehicle. If attendant is unavailable, machines will take cash or credit.
