= Canyon River (Ontario) =

- Location of the mouth of the Canyon River in Ontario

Location
- Country: Canada
- Province: Ontario
- Region: Northwestern Ontario
- District: Kenora
- Part: Kenora, Unorganized

Physical characteristics
- Source: Favel Lake
  - coordinates: 49°59′33″N 93°56′53″W
  - elevation: 373 m (1,224 ft)
- Mouth: Wabigoon River
  - coordinates: 50°04′37″N 93°37′56″W
  - elevation: 328 m (1,076 ft)

Basin features
- River system: Hudson Bay drainage basin

The Canyon River is a river in the Hudson Bay drainage basin in Unorganized Kenora District in northwestern Ontario, Canada. it is a tributary of the Wabigoon River.

== Course ==
The Canyon River begins at Favel Lake, just east of the community of Jones and Ontario Highway 671, and heads east out of the lake at the settlement of Favel into the long Canyon Lake, which extends east–west for 20 kilometres (12 mi). It takes in the right tributary Shrub Creek at the lake, upon which the settlements of Canyon and McIntosh are located. The river heads out of Canyon Lake at Outlet Bay, heads over several waterfalls including Sixty Two Foot Falls, and reaches its mouth at the Canyon Stretch on the Wabigoon River. From Favel Lake to the eastern tip of Canyon Lake, the river is paralleled by the Canadian National Railway transcontinental main line; Via Rail transcontinental Canadian trains travel on the line and stop at Canyon station.

== Tributaries ==
- Shrub Creek (right)

== Communities ==
- McIntosh
- Canyon
- Favel

== See also ==
- List of rivers of Ontario
