= Wabigoon Lake =

- Location within Ontario
- Location: Kenora District, northwestern Ontario
- Coordinates: 49°45′N 92°42′W
- Type: reservoir, natural lake
- Primary outflows: Wabigoon River
- Basin countries: Canada
- Max. length: 20 mi (32 km)
- Surface area: 26,000 acres (41 sq mi; 110 km^{2})
- Average depth: 19.6 feet (6.0 m)
- Max. depth: 47.1 ft (14.4 m)
- Shore length^{1}: 114 mi (183 km)
- Surface elevation: 1,083 ft (330 m)
- Settlements: Dryden
- ^{1} Shore length is not a well-defined measure.

Wabigoon Lake is a lake located in the Kenora District in northwestern Ontario, Canada. The community of Dryden (pop 8,198) is located on the north shore of the lake, and the primary inflow and outflow is the Wabigoon River. A dam built to provide power for the early pulp and paper company raised the original level of the lake by several feet and its current average depth is 19.6 feet (6.0 m), destroying a significant amount of the local timber and wild rice in the process.

The name "Wabigoon" comes from the Ojibwe waabigon, "marigold", or waabi-miigwan, "white feather".

== See also ==
- List of lakes in Ontario
