= Wabigoon River =

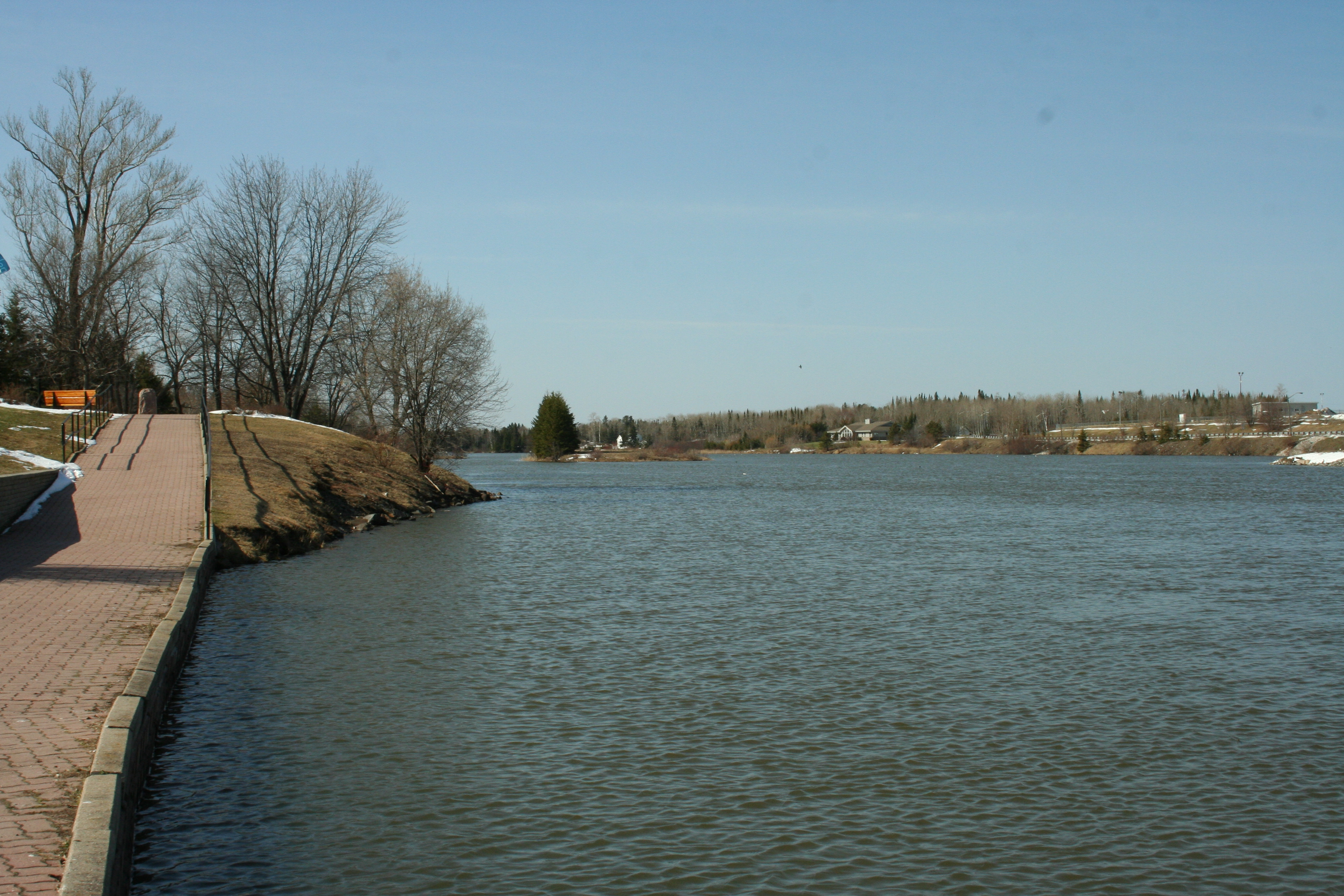
- The Wabigoon River as it exits Wabigoon Lake

- Location of the mouth of the Wabigoon River in Ontario
- Etymology: From the Ojibwe waabigon, "marigold", or waabi-miigwan, "white feather"

Location
- Country: Canada
- Province: Ontario
- Region: Northwestern Ontario
- District: Kenora

Physical characteristics
- Source: Raleigh Lake
  - coordinates: 49°28′08″N 91°56′12″W
  - elevation: 453 m (1,486 ft)
- Mouth: English River
  - coordinates: 50°15′46″N 93°58′46″W
  - elevation: 314 m (1,030 ft)
- Length: 235 km (146 mi)

Basin features
- River system: Hudson Bay drainage basin
- Tributaries
  - left: Canyon River (Ontario), Eagle River (Ontario), Crooked River (Ontario), Mennin River
  - right: Little Wabigoon River

The Wabigoon River is a river in Kenora District in northwestern Ontario, Canada. It flows from Raleigh Lake past Dryden, Ontario on Wabigoon Lake to join the English River. The name "Wabigoon" comes from the Ojibwe waabigon, "marigold", or waabi-miigwan, "white feather".

== Course ==
The river begins at Crocker Bay at the northwest of Raleigh Lake, flows northwest over the Raleigh Falls, then under Ontario Highway 17 and the Canadian Pacific Railway transcontinental main line at the settlement of Raleigh. It continues northwest, takes in the right tributary Little Wabigoon River, then turns southwest back under the CP line and Highway 17 at the settlement of Taché. The river takes in the left tributary Mennin River, flows over Walker Falls, and takes in the right tributary Melgund Creek all near the settlement of Borups Corners, enters Dinorwic Lake, and flows into Wabigoon Lake, where it takes in the left tributary Crooked River. The Wabigoon River exits the lake at the northwest at Dryden, and flows northwest, through Wainwright Township dam and generating station (operated by Regional Power, a subsidiary of Manulife Financial), takes in the left tributary Eagle River, passes under Ontario Highway 105 at Upper Falls, then under Ontario Highway 609 and the Canadian National Railway transcontinental main line and over Quibell Dam the latter three at the settlement of Quibell. It then heads northwest to Clay Lake, takes in the left tributary Canyon River at Canyon Stretch, passes through Segise Lake, and reaches its mouth at Ball Lake on the English River, which flows via the Winnipeg River and Nelson River to Hudson Bay.

== Mercury pollution ==
In 1962, Dryden Chemical Company began operating a chloralkali process plant in Dryden that produced chlorine and sodium hydroxide which were used at the nearby Dryden Pulp and Paper Company for bleaching pulp. Dryden Chemical Company dumped its waste water containing mercury into the Wabigoon River. The mercury pollution spread throughout the downstream Wabigoon-English River system. The mercury entered the food chain and accumulated in fish which were a major part of the diet for First Nations people on reserves at Grassy Narrows and Whitedog. This caused severe mercury poisoning with symptoms including neurological problems and birth defects among these people and also resulted in the closure of a commercial fishery and a fishing lodge in the area. In 1985, an agreement was signed which committed the federal and provincial governments and the two private companies involved to provide compensation. Dissolved mercury is now low in the river system and past concentrations are recorded in the sediments of Clay Lake. Elevated concentrations persist in larger, older fish in the river system, although concentrations have dropped considerably over the past few decades.

== Tributaries ==
- Wolf Creek (left)
- Canyon River (left)
- Clay Lake
  - Beaton Creek (right)
- Redbluff Creek (right)
- Blackbluff Creek (right)
- Hutchinson Creek (left)
- Buller Creek (right)
- Colenso Creek (right)
- Mutrie Creek (right)
- Eagle River (left)
- Beaver Creek (left)
- Shoshowae Creek (left)
- Rugby Creek (right)
- Gullwing Creek (right)
- Swanson's Creek (right)
- Wabigoon Lake
  - McLeod's Creek (left)
  - Threefork Creek (left)
  - Pitchinese Creek (left)
  - Blackwater Creek (right)
  - Nugget Creek (right)
- Dinorwic Lake
  - Tobacco Creek (left)
  - Crooked River (left)
  - McKenzie Creek (right)
  - Battie Creek (right)
- Melgund Creek (right)
- Mennin River (left)
- Little Wabigoon River (right)

== See also ==
- List of rivers of Ontario
- Ontario Minamata disease

== Sources ==
- "Wabigoon River". Geographical Names Data Base. Natural Resources Canada.
- "Wabigoon River". Atlas of Canada. Natural Resources Canada. 2010-02-04. Shows the river course.
