= Wabaseemoong Independent Nations =

Ojibwe First Nation band government in Ontario, Canada

Coordinates: 51°09′32″N 94°56′31″W

Wabaseemoong Independent Nations or more fully as the Wabaseemoong Independent Nations of One Man Lake, Swan Lake and Whitedog, is an Ojibway First Nation band government who reside 120 km northwest of Kenora, Ontario and 13 kilometres (8.1 mi) east of the Ontario-Manitoba border of northwestern Ontario, Canada. As of December 2018, the First Nation had a population of 2,000 registered people, of which their on-Reserve population was 1200 registered members and approximately 100 non-Band members.

== History ==
Prior to hydroelectric development in the 1950s, the First Nation was composed of three separate communities of One Man Lake, Swan Lake and Whitedog. The three communities were then amalgamated into a unified Band called the Islington Band of Saulteaux when the hydroelectric development flooding debased all their membership and significant portions of their Islington Traditional Land Use Area were made inaccessible.

In the 1960s and 1970s, the First Nation was severely affected by acute mercury poisoning, known as the Ontario Minamata disease due to mercury contamination affecting the English River. 9 tones of mercury were disposed of into the English River system. Many people of the Wabaseemoong and Grassy Narrows reservation were affected by this tragedy.

In 1983, the Islington Agreement was signed between the Province of Ontario and the Islington Band. The agreement established opportunities for the Islington Band in relation to forestry and resource development on the Traditional Land Use Area. The Agreement came as a result of the fluctuating water levels on the English River caused by Manitoba Hydro. A Memorandum of Understanding (MOU) was signed in 1991, introducing the concept of co-management of the Islington Traditional Land Use Area between the Province and the Band, but Ontario have not implemented their responsibilities under the MOU.

In 1990, after having a third of their children put in foster homes in the era of and in the aftermath of Sixties Scoop policies, Wabaseemoong Band Council passed a resolution banning the Children's Aid Society from entering the band's reserve to remove any more children.

Islington Band changed their name to the Wabaseemoong Band of Saulteaux on November 13, 1991. Band again changed their name to Wabaseemoong Independent Nations on March 20, 1992, to better reflect their composition. The largest of the communities is "Wabaseemoong" or Waabasimong, which means "Whitedog" in the Anishinaabe language, so the First Nation is also commonly known as Whitedog First Nation.

== Governance ==
The First Nation have an Act Electoral System of government, consisting of a Chief and four Councillors forming their council. Chief Waylon Scott, and Councillors began serving their two-year term on April 15, 2019. The Councillors are Glen Kent, Rocky Bunting, and Roanna Jourdain.

The First Nation is a member of the Bimose Tribal Council, a regional Chiefs Council, which in turn is a member of the Grand Council of Treaty 3, a Tribal Political Organization serving many of the First Nations in northwest Ontario and southeast Manitoba.

== Reserve ==
The First Nation were forced to live on 4 reservations:

- 8,480 hectares (21,000 acres) Wabaseemoong Indian Reserve (formerly the Islington Indian Reserve 29) located 48 kilometres (30 mi) northwest of Kenora and which serves as their main Indian reserve
- 1,117.3 hectares (2,761 acres) One Man Lake 29 Indian Reserve located 65 kilometres (40 mi) northwest of Kenora
- 2,237 hectares (5,530 acres) Swan Lake 29 Indian Reserve located 36 kilometres (22 mi) northwest of Kenora
- 379 hectares (940 acres) Agency Indian Reserve 30 on the Aulneau Peninsula in the Lake of the Woods in Ontario, which is shared with 12 other First Nations.

== Notable members ==
- Richard Wagamese (1955–2017), author, journalist
