= Water pollution in Canada =

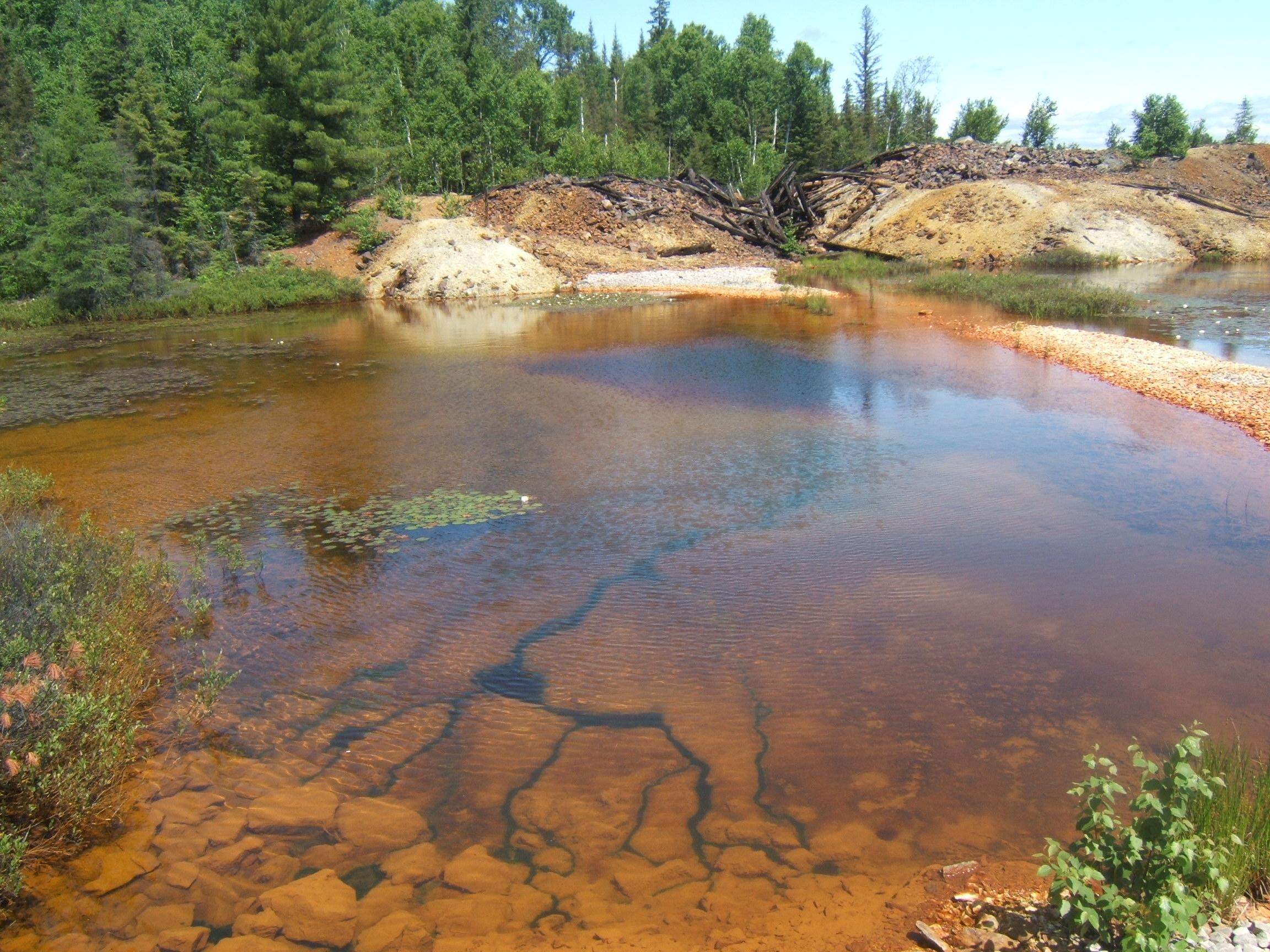
Acidic lake waste water at Northland Mine in Temagami, Ontario

Water pollution in Canada is generally local and regional in water-rich Canada, and most Canadians have "access to sufficient, affordable, and safe drinking water and adequate sanitation." Water pollution in Canada is caused by municipal sewage, urban runoff, industrial pollution and industrial waste, agricultural pollution, inadequate water infrastructure. This is a long-term threat in Canada due to "population growth, economic development, climate change, and scarce fresh water supplies in certain parts of the country."

== Comprehensive government initiatives ==
The Canadian federal government launched a number of initiatives to respond to water pollution including the Freshwater Action Plan (2017), and the $1.5 billion Oceans Protection Plan (2018). These focus on improving water resource management, reducing pollution at the source, taking action on toxic substances, monitoring water quality, investing in infrastructure, and developing regulations like the Wastewater System Effluent Regulations. In June 2024, the Canada Water Agency, was established through the Canada Water Agency Act. Formerly, a branch within Environment and Climate Change Canada, the agency oversees the Freshwater Action Plan.

On December 11, 2023, Bill C-61, First Nations Clean Water Act, was introduced in Parliament. As of December 2024, it was still in the committee review phase. The Bill aims to address the long-standing water crisis in First Nations communities, where many lack access to safe and adequate water systems. Bill C-61 acknowledges clean drinking water as a basic human right and establishes a framework for water and wastewater services co-developed with First Nations.

== Overview ==
While most Canadians have access to clean water, locally and regionally there are cases of "public beach closures, contaminated sediments, algal blooms, aquatic weed infestations, fish kills, shellfish harvesting closures, boil-water advisories, outbreaks of waterborne illnesses, and contaminated ground water", according to a 1998 report from British Columbia.

Water pollution is caused by municipal sewage, urban runoff, industrial pollution and industrial waste, agricultural pollution, inadequate water infrastructure.

=== Surface water pollution ===
There are two major types of water pollution in Canada, surface water pollution and ground water pollution.

=== Ground water pollution ===
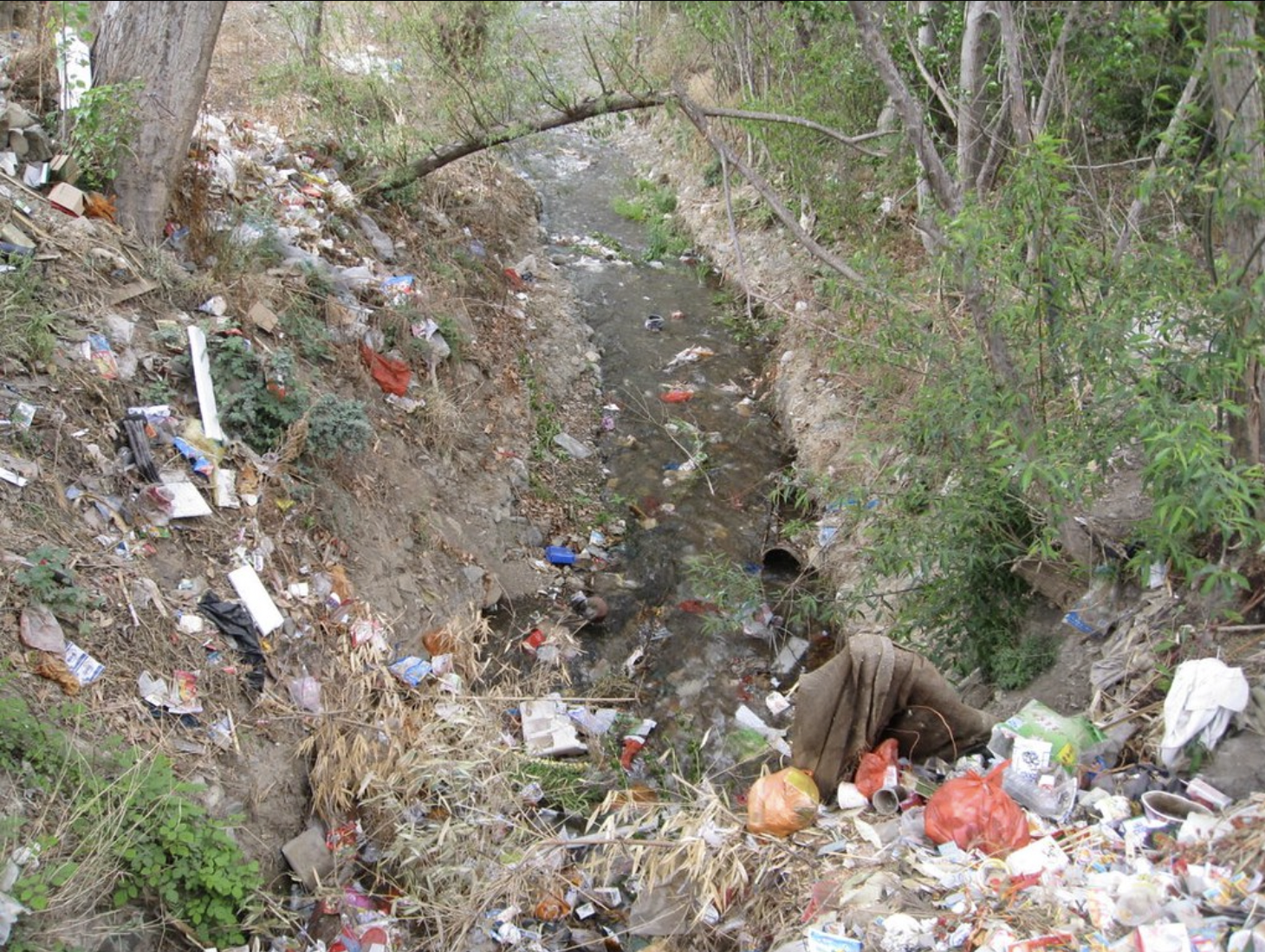
Water way polluted with different types of waste

Groundwater contaminants point sources include municipal landfill sites, industrial waste disposal sites, "leaking gasoline storage tanks, leaking septic tanks, and accidental spills". Distributed, or non-point sources include "infiltration from farm land treated with pesticides and fertilizers". Ground water pollution affects water supplies as the contaminants eventually reach rivers, lakes and oceans.

== Sources ==
Sources of water pollution include point sources, nonpoint sources, and trans-boundary sources.

=== Point sources ===
In Canada, there are many monitoring programs in place to trace and regulate point source pollution, where pollutants can be traced to a "single identifiable source". By 1998, BC for example, reported that most "end of-pipe" point discharges from industrial and municipal outfalls" were generally regulated and controlled.

=== Nonpoint source pollution ===
Nonpoint source pollution (NPS) cannot be easily traced to one source, making them more difficult to regulate. They are released gradually into the water system from many different sources. NPS accounts for a "substantial amount of water pollution in Canada", the problem has not been addressed as vigorously as point-source emissions (pollution from a single identifiable source).

NPS pollutants from largely unregulated sources, include land development and agriculture. By 1998, British Columbia reported that NPS was the major "cause of water pollution in that province by 1998 and that these pollutants "pose significant and growing threats" to water resources.

The main types of NPS are sediment, nutrients, toxic contaminants and chemicals, and pathogens.

The major sources of NSP are urban and highway run off, the agricultural, forestry, and mining industries, marinas and boating activities. Fertilizer runoff, and agricultural waste water are examples of NSP in the agricultural industry. In urban areas, stormwater is an NSP, as is surface runoff on highways.

Popular beaches on the coast of New Brunswick, such as Parlee Beach, and Murray Beach Provincial Park have been contaminated by upstream sources, which may include "municipal sewage, or runoff from farms or forest clearcuts." The province initiated new water quality testing protocols for eight provincial parks including Parlee Beach, Murray Beach, Mactaquac Provincial Park, New River Beach, Mount Carleton, Oak Bay, New Brunswick, Miscou, and Val-Comeau because of "their popularity and because some of them had problems in the past".

=== Trans-boundary sources ===
Transboundary pollution is water pollution that originates in one region or country but threatens water quality in another jurisdiction. An example is the contamination of the Columbia River by Teck Resources in Trail, British Columbia that contaminated the river downstream in the American State of Washington.

The American Chemical Society reported in July 2020, that new forms of Per- and polyfluoroalkyl substances (PFOAs) were detected in the Arctic Ocean. They reported "higher levels of PFAS" in the "water exiting the Arctic Ocean compared with the water entering the Arctic from the North Atlantic". These are considered to be "forever chemicals" because of their "persistence, toxicity, and widespread occurrence in the blood of general populations." PFASs are not manufactured in Canada and importing, selling, or using of PFOS or PFOS-containing products has been banned with some exceptions, since 2008.

== Causes ==
=== Municipal sewage ===
According to Marq de Villiers in his 2003 non-fiction Water: The Fate of Our Most Precious Resource, until the 1970s approximately a third of Canadian municipalities dumped raw sewage into rivers with no waste-water treatment. By 2011, there was no national regulatory body for drinking water. Water pollution by sewage is one of the main culprits involved in polluting drinking water. By 2009, advocacy group Ecojustice estimated that raw sewage dumping in Canada represented approximately 200 billion litres a year. By 2009, the Halifax Regional Municipality in Nova Scotia was still dumping human waste directly into the Halifax harbour. Errors and inadequacies in sewage facilities resulted in 190 million liter raw sewage spill into the Ottawa River in 2004, and the release of "partially treated sewage water into the Red River in Winnipeg, Manitoba in 2011.

Sewage is not a waste product and it can be converted into wealth economically in a circular economy by using the aquatic life cycle of mosquitoes and non-biting midges. Organic matter in the sewage is consumed and transformed as adult mosquitoes and midges which can be used as fish/poultry meal.

In October 2015, Montreal intentionally dumped eight billion litres of raw sewage from an same interceptor sewer in the St. Lawrence River, the city made international headlines. It had been a common practice to dump sewage into the St. Lawrence prior to the 1980s. Montreal dumped 10 billion litres of wastewater into St. Lawrence in the spring of 2003, 7.6 billion litres in the fall of 2003, and 770 million litres of untreated wastewater in the fall of 2005. Heavy rains in Toronto has an older sewer systems that is overwhelmed often by heavy rains. The City is then forced to "bypass water-treatment plants and send raw sewage into Lake Ontario. In July 2013, a flash flood resulted in a billion litres of sewage and storm water overflowed onto city streets flowing into Toronto's harbour.

Halifax, Nova Scotia dumped raw sewage into the harbour prior to the construction of their new construction of their new wastewater treatment plant in 2008. There was some sewage discharged "unknowingly, when sewer lines were cut during construction".

Winnipeg, Manitoba dumped approximately 185-million litres of raw sewage into "Winnipeg's rivers since 2004 due to the city's antiquated combined-sewer system". The required massive upgrades to Winnipeg's sewage system would cost $4 billion.

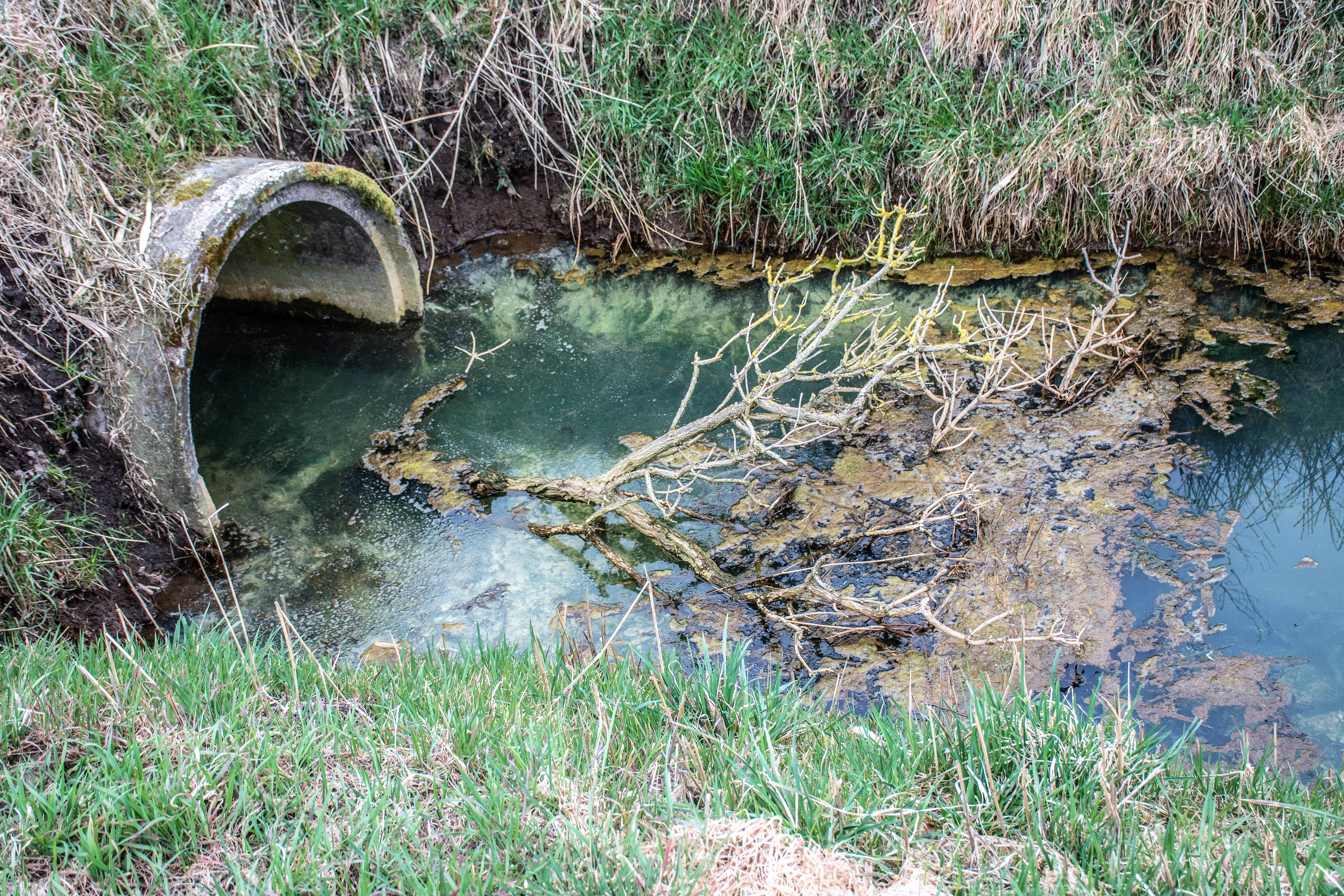
Sewage water polluting the environment

Since 1894, Victoria, British Columbia began dumping raw sewage into waters that flow towards Puget Sound, United States. By 2015, the Victoria and Esquimalt region in British Columbia were dumping approximately 130-million litres of raw sewage every day into the Juan de Fuca Strait, which leads to the Pacific Ocean. This practice ended by January 2021, with the completion of a new $775 million sewage McLoughlin Point Wastewater Treatment Plant in Esquimalt that can treat the "equivalent of 43 Olympic-sized pools of waste daily".

=== Urban runoff ===
Canada has been studying the sources of urban runoff—stormwater and snowmelt—pollution for decades because it "contributes significantly to the deterioration of surface water quality in many locations". The major pollution source in urban runoff is from the "vehicular transportation-related activities and metallic building envelopes." By 1986, the federal Department of Environment had initiated a research program to identify, identify, and trace toxins to their sources, particularly in relation to urban runoff.

CBC's French-language service Radio-Canada reported that after heavy rainfall, Montreal's raw sewage mixes with rainwater and is allowed to flow directly into the St. Lawrence River and the Rivière des Prairies. Surfers in the area have gotten ill because of the polluted waters, which in some places, has coliform bacteria levels "20 times higher than the acceptable levels for swimming."

=== Agricultural pollution ===
Agriculture and Agri-Food Canada reported in 2014 that the agricultural sector contributes to water pollution through "surface runoff of pesticides, fertilizers and manure, or leaching of nitrogen into groundwater" which eventually is discharged into surface water bodies. These dissolved contaminants from agricultural activities enter into lakes, rivers or oceans.

According to a 4 August 2010 Drumheller Mail article, tests undertaken by University of Calgary researchers found an anabolic steroid, Zeranol—which is an estrogen-like compound—in samples taken in 2006 from the Tolman Bridge and Morrin Bridge on the Red Deer River, Alberta. The Zeranol "could be affecting the fish gender". The researchers said that this "contaminant comes from farms' cattle because it is not used in human medicine and therefore is not likely to come from municipal sewage treatment plant, the other possible source of contamination". According to a 2020 article in the journal Ambio, researchers have focused on the presence of "analytics compounds such as endocrine-disrupting chemicals (EDCs) or pharmaceuticals" in our water systems.

=== Inadequate water infrastructure ===
==== Long-term Drinking Water Advisories (DWA)s ====
First Nations communities in Canada have been under Long-term Drinking Water Advisories (DWA)s for decades, according to a June 7, 2016 report, Human Rights Watch (HRW) report. The report noted that most Canadians in water-rich Canada—one of the world's wealthiest nations—have "access to sufficient, affordable, and safe drinking water and adequate sanitation." In many First Nations communities, the water is "contaminated, hard to access, or at risk due to faulty treatment systems". The report noted that many of the DWAs had been in effect "for years, sometimes for decades". Successive federal governments have studied the issue since 1977, but failed to find a solution. The limited water and sanitation infrastructure in First Nations communities, "contributes to the severe housing shortage on reserves", resulting in "long waiting lists for housing, and overcrowding". Until the infrastructure is upgraded, "communities cannot increase their housing." From 1996 to 2015 the federal government's arbitrary cap on the base budget of the federal department that funds and regulates water and sanitation infrastructure on reserves that exacerbated the problem. From 2015 to 2021 with increased federal funding 103 DWAs were lifted. By March 25, 56 advisories remained but of these over half have already begun construction of water infrastructure and in a third of the cases, the lifting of the advisory is pending.

== Notable water pollution incidents ==
One of the "worst cases of environmental poisoning in Canadian history", according to The Lancet, occurred in northwest Ontario when a pulp and paper operation owned by the British conglomeration, Reed Paper Group, discharged about 10,000 kilograms (22,000 lb) of mercury from their chloralkali plant in Dryden into the Wabigoon River between 1962 and 1970. The mercury contamination of the Wabagoon River system was extensive. The mercury discharge contaminated waterways in the neighbouring province of Saskatchewan, which resulted in a lawsuit against Reed Paper—Interprovincial Cooperatives Ltd v R. The Wabigoon River was "still highly contaminated" in 2016.

In 1997, the Yamaska River was one of the most polluted rivers in the province of Quebec—mainly because of agricultural waste and pesticides. Human activities, including environmental disturbances in the Yamaska River basin, caused a deterioration in the quality of both surface and groundwater. Three other polluted rivers also flow into the St. Lawrence River—Boyer River, Chaudière River, and L'Assomption River. The federal and provincial governments established the Saint-Laurent Action Plan 1990-1994 and the Saint-Laurent Vision 2000, 1994 -1998 to conserve and protect the river. One of the goals of the agreement was to "prevent and reduce the effects of agricultural pollution on four rivers—Yamaska River, Boyer River, Chaudière River, and L'Assomption River—that flow into the St. Lawrence". According to the non-profit organization, the Quebec-based Rivers Foundation, there were 651 sewage spills in the Yamaska River in 2015. On June 28, 2016, the City of Saint-Hyacinthe, Quebec dumped approximately 8,000 tonnes of raw sewage into the Yamaska River allegedly causing the deaths of thousands of fish.

The "most serious case of water contamination in Canadian history" was the "fatal E. coli outbreak in Walkerton, Ontario in May 2000. In his 2002 Walkerton judicial inquiry report, Justice Dennis O'Connor's said it "could have been prevented by proper chlorination of drinking water." O'Connor said that other contributing factors included deregulation of water testing and cuts to environmental programs by the Ontario government at that time under then Ontario premier, Mike Harris. Harris served from 1995 through 2002 whose program based on his "Common Sense Revolution" included privatization of water testing, deregulation and cuts to provincial services. During his time as premier the budget of the Ontario Department of the Environment was cut by 42% resulting in the layoffs of over 2000 staff members, including those involved in research, monitoring, enforcement, testing, and inspection. Water testing was privatized.

In May 2000, in the Walkerton E. coli outbreak, six people died and 2000 had gastroenteritis because of inadequate water treatment. In the May 2000 Walkerton E. coli outbreak six people died and 2000 had gastroenteritis because of inadequate water treatment.

In the 2000s, concerns were raised that the Athabasca oil sands were causing water contamination in the Athabasca River watershed, in regards to acid rain, and the presence of arsenic, lead and mercury in higher levels than those recommended in Canada's national guidelines in water downstream from Albertan oil sites. Acid rain is rain that has been contaminated by airborne chemicals, making it acidic. Two major causes of acid rain are sulphur dioxide and nitrogen oxide. The Athabasca River has been contaminated with oil and tailing pond water since the beginning of oil sands development through a series of leaks. In 2007 Suncor spilled 9.8 million liters of oil sands waste water into the Athabaska river. The oil sands tailings ponds are in close proximity to the river drastically which increases the likelihood of contamination due to ground water leakages. It was revealed in 1997 that Suncor's tailing ponds had been leaking 1,600 cubic metres (57,000 cu ft) of toxic water into the Athabaska a day. The Athabasca River is the largest freshwater delta in the world but concerns are raised about Suncor and Syncrude's leaking tail ponds. A 2010, Proceedings of the National Academy of Sciences of the United States of America article said that arsenic, cadmium, chromium, lead, mercury, nickel and other toxic metal elements enter the tributaries and rivers of the Athabasca from oil sands development.

Pollution of the Great Lakes—Superior, Michigan, Huron, Erie, and Ontario—the largest system of fresh surface water in the world—accounting for about 18% of the fresh surface water globally, has been severely affected by water pollution. The high levels of phosphorus in the lakes, which leads to eutrophication and the growth of algae and eventually hypoxia—oxygen depletion. Lake Erie was pronounced "dead" in the 1970s. From the 1970s to the 1990s, the province of Ontario worked to restore the Lakes by "cleaning up several highly polluted harbours, bays and waterfronts" and "dramatically reducing many toxic chemicals that were harming fish and wildlife." Phosphate detergents were banned, sewage treatments were upgraded, more environmentally-friendly agricultural practices were adopted to "reduce nutrients entering the lake". In September 2012, the United States and Canada signed amended version of the Great Lakes Water Quality Agreement. The overarching purpose of the Agreement is to "restore and maintain the chemical, physical and biological integrity of the waters". Significant amendments made to the Agreement include "address[ing] aquatic invasive species, habitat degradation and the effects of climate change, and support continued work on existing threats to people's health and the environment in the Great Lakes Basin such as harmful algae, toxic chemicals, and discharges from other vessels".

The 1970 Arctic Waters Pollution Prevention Act set new guidelines to prevent pollution of Canadian Arctic waters. By 2008, Fisheries and Oceans reported that some Arctic waters have levels of lead that are higher than the Canadian guidelines. Pollution of the Arctic Ocean doubled from 2002 to 2012.

In 2006, Lake Winnipeg's algae blooms was considered to be the worst algae problem of any large freshwater lake in the world, according to Canadian Geographic. In 2011, the Province of Manitoba released a report by the University of Regina's Canada Research Chair in Environmental Change and Society. which described the "sudden ecosystem state change in Lake Winnipeg" that was "caused by eutrophication."

Irving Pulp and Paper, a private company owned by J. D. Irving, was charged with 15 counts under the Fisheries Act after its Reversing Falls pulp and paper mill in west Saint John, New Brunswick discharged a harmful effluent in ten instances into the St. John River between June 2014 and August 2016. The penalty was set at CA$3.5M—"one of the largest penalties for depositing of deleterious substances. In a New Brunswick provincial court, Irving pleaded guilty in October 2018, to three of the fifteen charges and "agreed to pay $3.5 million in penalties as part of an agreed statement of facts and joint recommendation". The Crown prosecutor Paul Adams said that volume and toxicity of the effluent were "very significant". In response, in October 2018, Irving lawyers challenged the constitutionality of the Fisheries Act. The Saint John mill was previously convicted of violating the Fisheries Act in 1999, 2009 and 2010 with penalties ranging between $37,000 and $75,000.

== See also ==
- Water supply and sanitation in Canada
- Great Lakes § Pollution
- Environmental issues in Canada
