= Clean Water Act (Ontario) =

Ontario, Canada statute

The Clean Water Act (S.O. 2006, Chapter 22) is an act of the Legislative Assembly of Ontario. The purpose of this Act is to protect existing and future sources of drinking water. The Clean Water Act was enacted following the Walkerton Tragedy of 2000, during which contaminated drinking water resulted in seven fatalities and caused illness in over 2,300 individuals.

The Clean Water Act, 2006 (Bill 43) is a major part of the Ontario government's commitment to ensuring that every Ontarian has access to safe drinking water. Protecting water at its source is the first step in the multi-barrier approach to source water protection. By stopping contaminants from getting into sources of drinking water — lakes, rivers and aquifers — we can provide the first line of defence in the protection of our environment and the health of Ontarians. For the first time, communities will be required to create and carry out a plan to protect the sources of their municipal drinking water supplies. The Clean Water Act, 2006 will:

- Require local communities to look at the existing and potential threats to their water and set out and implement the actions necessary to reduce or eliminate significant threats.
- Empower communities to take action to prevent threats from becoming significant.
- Require public participation on every local source protection plan. This means everyone in the community gets a chance to contribute to the planning process.
- Require that all plans and actions are based on sound science.

The legislation sets out a basic framework for the establishment of community-based groups that represent a cross-section of sectors and geographic areas within Conservation Authority boundaries. These community-based groups are called Source Protection Committees and there are 19 such groups across Ontario. The Clean Water Act, 2006 also introduced the Ontario Drinking Water Stewardship Program (ODWSP) a financial assistance program for farmers, landowners and small or medium businesses for activities that reduce threats to municipal drinking water sources.

== See also ==
- New Brunswick Environmental and Heritage Acts
