= Multi-barrier approach =

The Multi-barrier approach is a key paradigm for ensuring safe drinking water in jurisdictions such as Ontario, elsewhere in Canada, and New Zealand. It is defined as,

An integrated system of procedures, processes and tools that collectively prevent or reduce the contamination of drinking water from source to tap in order to reduce risks to public health.

In Part 2 of his report on the Walkerton Tragedy, Justice Dennis O'Connor discusses five elements of the multi-barrier approach:

1. Source water protection—Taking action to minimize adverse impacts on source waters reduces the risk from pathogens and chemical pollutants in that water, and can also reduce the degree of treatment required.
2. Robust water treatment—Having treatment trains with more than one step provides redundancy against treatment failure.
3. A secure water supply network—Providing a disinfectant residual to the extreme points of the distribution system protects against water quality degradation and microbial intrusion.
4. Monitoring programs—Monitoring water quality at each of the above points (source, treatment plant, and tap) allows the treatment process to be adjusted to deal with fluctuations in water quality and ensures that the drinking water is safe at the point of human consumption.
5. Prepared responses to adverse conditions—Having response plans (for example, issuing a boil-water advisory) in place provides a final barrier to protect the public if harmful contaminants should make it through the other barriers.

The holistic perspective of the multi-barrier approach also incorporates many players into the goal of keeping drinking water safe. These include managers, researchers, regulators, legislators, and the public.

== See also ==
- Clean Water Act (Ontario)
- Point of use water treatment
- Source water protection
- Water safety plan
- Water quality
- Walkerton tragedy
- Public health

== Sources ==
- Health Canada. The Multi-Barrier Approach to Safe Drinking Water. Accessed: 10-Aug-2010.
- Federal-Provincial-Territorial Committee on Drinking Water & Water Quality Task Group (2002). From Source To Tap - The Multi-Barrier Approach To Safe Drinking Water.
- Canadian Council of Ministers of the Environment. Multi-Barrier Approach. Accessed: 10-Aug-2010.
- Hrudey, SE, & Hrudey, EJ (2004).Safe Drinking Water: Lessons from Recent Outbreaks in Affluent Nations, ISBN 978-1-84339-042-8
- Hrudey, SE, Payment, P, Huck, PM, Gillham, RW, & Hrudey, EJ (2003). "A fatal waterborne disease epidemic in Walkerton, Ontario: comparison with other waterborne outbreaks in the developed world" (PDF). Water Science & Technology. 47 (3): 7–14. doi:10.2166/wst.2003.0146. PMID 12638998. Archived from the original (PDF) on 2011-07-06.
- O'Connor, Hon. Dennis R. (2002). Part 2: Report of the Walkerton Inquiry: Strategy for Safe Drinking Water.
