= Water supply and sanitation in Canada =

Data
- Water coverage (broad definition): 100%
- Sanitation coverage (broad definition): 100%
- Share of collected wastewater treated: 97%
- Continuity of supply: 100%
- Average urban water use (L/person/day): 343
- Share of household metering: 56% (1999)
- Annual investment in WSS: n/a
- Share of self-financing by utilities: partial
- Share of tax-financing: partial
- Share of external financing: none

Institutions
- Decentralization to municipalities: Full
- National water and sanitation company: No
- Water and sanitation regulator: Yes, in some provinces
- Responsibility for policy setting: Department of Environment and Department of Health
- Sector law: No (only for water resources)
- No. of rural service providers: n/a

Canada has nearly universal and generally good quality access to water, but a lack of clean drinking water in many First Nations communities remains a problem. Water use in Canada is high compared to Europe, since water tariffs are low and 44% of users are not metered.

Despite a commitment by the federal government to promote increased cost recovery, only 50% of the cost of maintaining and operating water infrastructure is actually being recovered from users through tariffs, the rest being financed through taxes.

== Access and service quality ==
Access to water supply in Canada is nearly universal. Concerning sanitation, nearly 75% of Canadians are serviced by municipal sewer systems. The remaining 25 percent of the Canadian population is served by septic disposal systems.

== Service quality ==
=== Water supply ===
Canada is surrounded on three sides by the Pacific, Arctic and Atlantic oceans and has over 243,000 km of coastline. This, combined with the characteristics of Canada's topography and climate, results in abundant freshwater resources.

Canadian drinking water supplies in cities are generally of excellent quality and supply is continuous. On occasion, however, despite the best efforts of water suppliers and in some cases for reasons beyond their control, municipal water supplies can become contaminated either chemically or biologically. If this occurs, residents typically are advised to take precautionary measures, such as boiling water before consuming it. In an average year, some 500 boil water advisories normally of 3 to 4 day duration, are issued in respect to municipal water supply services, often following severe environmental conditions affecting the quality of the water supply source. An unusually extreme case of poor water quality has been the Walkerton Tragedy, a series of events that accompanied the contamination of the water supply of Walkerton, Ontario, by E. coli bacteria in 2000. In 2001 a similar outbreak in North Battleford, Saskatchewan caused by the protozoan Cryptosporidium affected at least 5,800 people.

=== Water supply on First Nations reserves ===
Canadian drinking water supplies on First Nations land is substandard in many locations and has been for many years.

Since 1977, successive federal governments failed to resolve the water and sanitation infrastructure problems on First Nations reserves in Canada, and the water on many reserves was "contaminated, hard to access, or at risk due to faulty treatment systems", according to a June 2016 Human Rights Watch (HRW) report. The report noted that many of the DWAs had been in effect "for years, sometimes for decades". According to the Human Rights Watch, First Nations reserves in Canada were found to have water contaminations that included coliform, E. coli, Trihalomethane, and uranium, which may cause gastrointestinal diseases or increased risks for cancer.

According to a 2001 Indian and Northern Affairs/Ontario First Nations Technical Services Corporation co-funded Ontario Clean Water Agency survey of water systems on Indian reserves in Ontario, 62 communities had severe problems affecting the communities' water systems. In 2005, 800 members of the Kashechewan First Nation, which had been on a long-term Drinking Water Advisories (DWA)s since 2003, were evacuated after E. coli bacteria were discovered in their water supply system. This represented about 60% of the community's 1,900 members. On November 5, 2005, the federal government reported that the water plant repairs improved water quality to safe provincial standards.

In 2005, Phil Fontaine, then-chief of the Assembly of First Nations, said that over 100 aboriginal communities in Canada were living under permanent long-term boil-water advisories.

The First Nations Health Authority (FNHA) in British Columbia monitors 285 community water systems in 193 First Nations in British Columbia. In 2011, 11 long term advisories that had lasted longer than 12 months, were lifted. In 2016 and in 2017, 7 long term advisories were lifted. By January 31, 2019, there were 10 DWAs in effect across 8 First Nation communities in British Columbia.

By 2015, there were 105 DWAs in effect in First Nations communities. An arbitrary cap from 1996 though 2015—limited the annual increase on the budget of the federal department that funds and regulates water and sanitation infrastructure on reserves—to 2% "regardless of population growth, inflation, or need." The funding constraints prevented necessary improvements "water supplied to many First Nations communities on lands known as reserves is contaminated, hard to access, or at risk due to faulty treatment systems". The report noted that many of the DWAs had been in effect "for years, sometimes for decades".

Following the 2015 Canadian federal election additional funds were allocated to remove the long-term drinking water advisories (DWA)s over the next five years.

On March 22, 2018, World Water Day, at the launch of the International Decade for Action on Water for Sustainable Development, 13-year-old Canadian water protector Autumn Peltier, Wikwemikong First Nation, raised concerns about access to drinking water on Canadian reserves at the United Nations General Assembly at UN headquarters. She said, "No child should grow up not knowing what clean water is, or never knowing what running water is." According to a March 22, 2018 CTV News report, First Nations communities have differing needs in terms of providing safe water—Cat Lake First Nation in Ontario "needs a new water treatment system, the Miawpukek First Nation in Newfoundland requires equipment repairs, and the White Bear First Nation in Saskatchewan needs an entirely new treatment plant". "Completion of a new water treatment system can take 3 to 4 years on average to complete."

By December 31, 2018, 78 of these advisories had been lifted, "36 added and one was deactivated". He added that "work is underway to end the remaining 62 long-term advisories and prevent further short-term advisories from becoming long-term". According to the official site that tracks progress on the provision of safe drinking water on reserves, one more long-term boil water advisory was removed by February 24. The federal budgets allocated $1.8 billion over five years in 2016, an additional $49.1 million over three years in 2017, and an additional $172.6 million in 2018, towards improving access to safe drinking water.

From November 2015 through January 19, 2024, 144 long-term drinking water advisories (DWA)s were lifted. 28 are still in effect in 26 communities.

=== Sanitation ===
In many cities and communities across Canada, treatment of waste water is either insufficient or non-existent. Although some communities have advanced waste water treatment plants, many others are dumping untreated or poorly treated liquid waste into natural water systems. Fifteen percent of inland communities undertake only primary level waste water treatment. Coastal communities face the greatest challenges, with the majority having only primary treatment, and some, no treatment at all. And even when there is adequate waste water treatment, storm water can cause the sewer system to overflow, allowing raw sewage to spill directly into rivers, lakes, and oceans.

In 1999, 97% of the Canadian population on sewers received some form of waste water treatment. The remaining 3% of Canadians served by sewage collection systems were not connected to waste water treatment facilities in 1999 and discharged their untreated sewage directly into receiving water bodies.

== Link to water resources ==
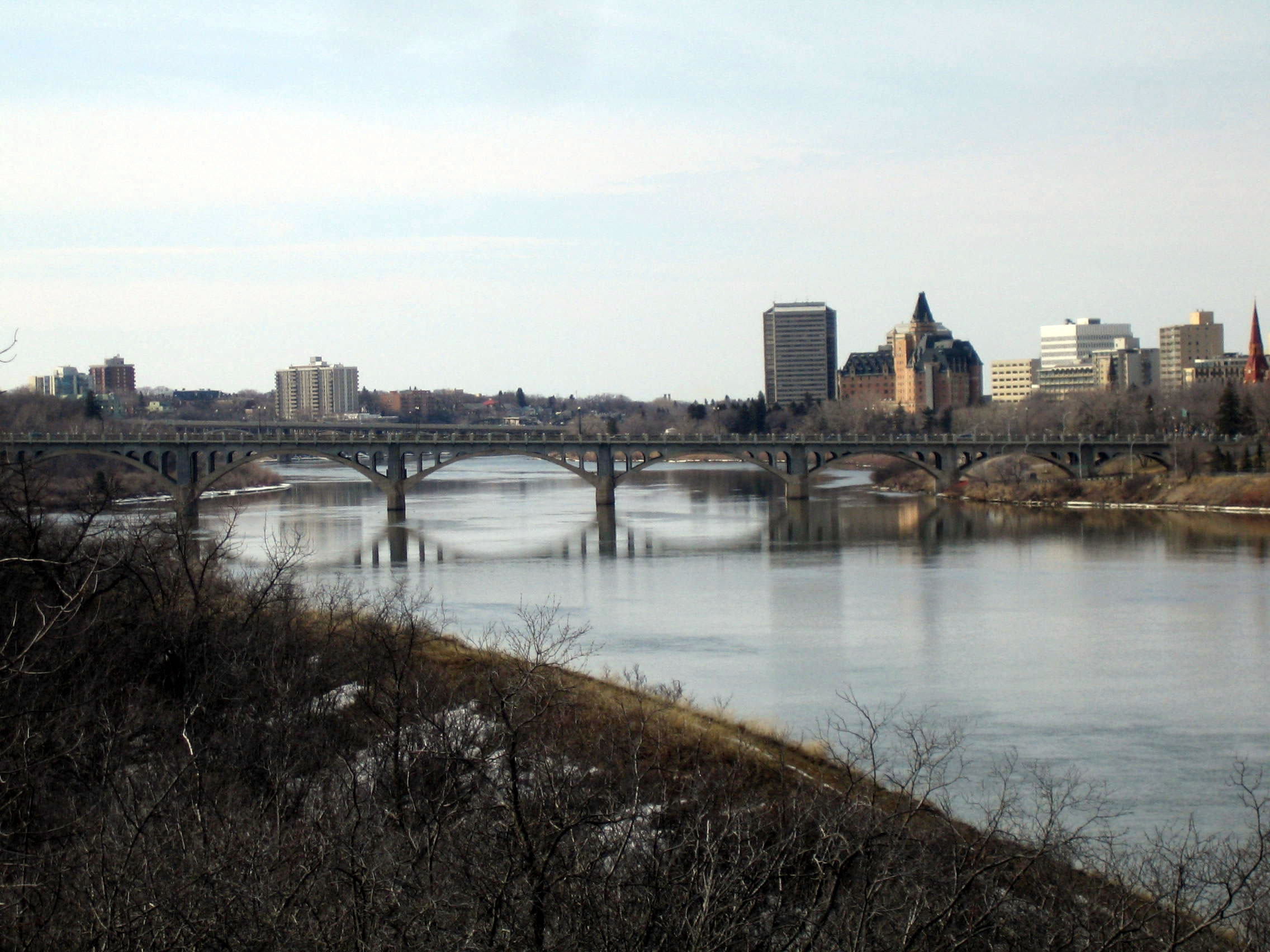
The South Saskatchewan River, shown here at Saskatoon on its lower reach, is one of Canada's rivers that may be negatively affected by climate change

While Canada has significant fresh water reserves (9% of the world's renewable freshwater), this water is not always available where needed. With 85% of the population living along the southern border with the United States and most of the country's fresh water draining to the north it is not surprising that those drainage basins with higher freshwater use-to-availability ratios are also located in southern Canada.

The drainage area of greatest concern is the South Saskatchewan, Missouri and Assiniboine-Red area. Flows in the South Saskatchewan are fully allocated and predictions of glacial retreat and reduced winter snow coverage due to global warming may significantly impact a river system that relies on glacial and snow melt for most of its summer flows.

Municipal water supply accounts for 12% of water use in Canada. The other main water users are cooling water for power generation (64%), manufacturing (14%) and agriculture (9%).

=== Montreal ===
The water supply of Montréal is taken from lac Saint-Louis, lac des Deux-Montagnes, Rivière des Prairies and the St. Lawrence River. This water is then treated in seven plants with a daily capacity of 2,917,000 m^{3} for 1.8 million residents and industries, businesses and institutions. The river receives untreated liquid waste from metropolitan Montreal and the newly developed suburbs by way of over 150 discharge outlets. Whenever there is significant rainfall on the island of Montreal, household sewage is mixed with the city street rainwater and discharged untreated into the river. The Rivière des Prairies used to receive massive discharges of untreated waste water from the city, turning it into essentially an open sewer; however, ecological intervention and modern waste water treatment mostly reversed the damage and the river is often considered clean by the RSMA(Réseau de suivi du milieu aquatique), and suitable for swimming. A CAN$10 billion investment program is underway in Montreal to upgrade water treatment plants, to replace ageing water pipes and to install roughly 23,000 meters for industries, businesses and institutions until 2013.

=== Ottawa ===
Most of Ottawa's drinking water is drawn from the Ottawa River and treated at the city's two water purification plants at Britannia and Lemieux Island. After treatment, Ottawa's clean water supply is then pressurized and distributed naturally using the flow of the Ottawa River. This process occurs at the Fleet Street Pumping Station, Ottawa's oldest water treatment facility and the last remaining example of gravity-based water pumping in Canada. The city's wastewater is discharged after treatment at the Robert O. Pickard Environmental Centre - the city's only wastewater treatment plant located in the East End near Rockcliffe Airport. Most houses are metered and an average resident of Ottawa uses approximately 250 liters of water a day. The 23,000 m2 Britannia Water Treatment Plant, which is situated on 18.7 hectares of city property adjacent to the Britannia Yacht Club, and the Britannia Conservation area centered on the NCC's Mud Lake was commissioned and constructed between 1956 and 1959. It treats an average of about 200 megalitres of water a day. The Britannia Water Treatment Plant was included amongst other architecturally interesting and historically significant buildings in Doors Open Ottawa, held June 2 and 3, 2012.

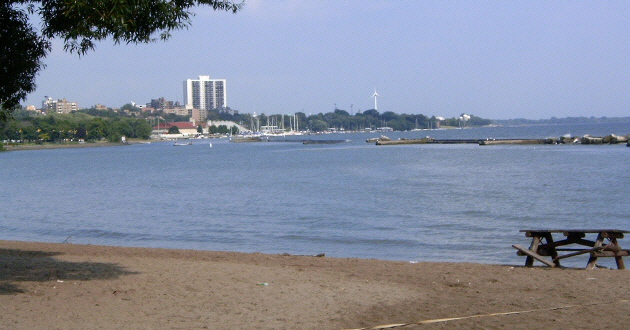
Lake Ontario is the source of drinking water for Toronto

=== Toronto ===
Toronto obtains all its drinking water from Lake Ontario. It is then treated in four treatment plants, three along the shore of the lake and one on Centre Island. Waste water is treated in four treatment plants. Average household use was 315 cubic meters/year in 2006. The average annual water and waste water bill in 2006 was CAN$429 for metered customers. In 2006, there were about 72,000 un-metered customers in Toronto. In 2007 the city began providing meters to flat-rate customers and upgrading meters of all 465,000 other customers to enable automated, radio-based meter reading by 2015.

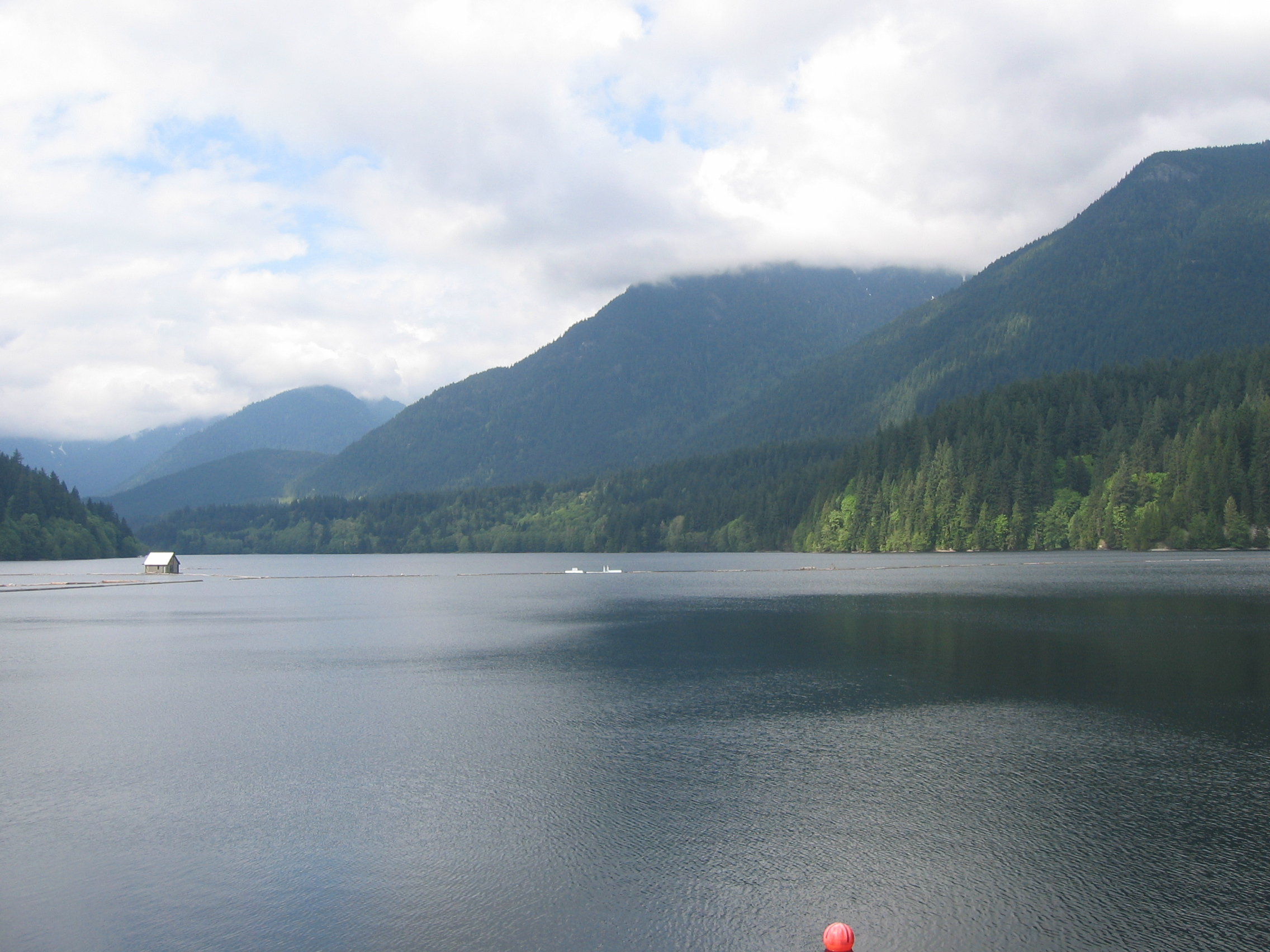
Capilano Lake is the source of 40% of Vancouver's drinking water

=== Metro Vancouver ===
Metro Vancouver's water system is one of the largest in North America. Almost 600 square kilometers of mountainous land is closed to public access to protect the large reservoirs which collect rain and snow melt. Three watersheds - the Capilano, Seymour and Coquitlam Watersheds are the water source for more than two million residents in the most populated urban region of British Columbia. Each watershed supplies about one-third of the region's tap water. The regional district's long-standing closed watershed policy is one component of a water supply system that provides multiple barriers to contamination, from source to tap.

In 2010, Metro Vancouver opened the Seymour-Capilano Filtration Plant, the largest water filtration plant in Canada and the largest ultraviolet light disinfection facility in Canada. The filtration plant improves Seymour source water by removing turbidity and micro-organisms, and by reducing the amount of chlorine required to maintain water quality. Following completion of the Twin Tunnels Project in late 2013, Capilano source water will also be filtered at the same plant and distributed by regional water mains.

In summer, when water demand peaks, there are region-wide restrictions on lawn sprinkling to ensure that water supplies are adequate for more important uses, such as drinking water and fighting fires. In 2008 Metro Vancouver launched a campaign inviting the region's residents to make a "tap water pledge" to drink tap water in refillable bottles instead of buying single-use plastic water bottles, with the goal to reduce sales of bottled water by 20 per cent by 2010. In 2011, 85 per cent majority of residents polled in the region said they primarily drink Metro Vancouver tap water instead of buying bottled water. The region's waste water is treated in one of five waste water treatment plants operated by Metro Vancouver, two of which use primary treatment and the remaining three use secondary treatment.

== Water use ==
Residential consumers in Canada used 343 litres per person per day, or roughly twice as much per person as in other industrialized countries, with the exception of the United States and Australia. According to one source water use in Montreal, where there is little metering, is particularly high at 1,287 liter per person per day in 1999.

According to the Environment Canada, the following sectors account for the following shares of municipal water use:

- 52% residential users
- 19% commercial users
- 16% industrial users
- 13% leakage.

However, a different part of the same web site of Environment Canada states that leakage losses are actually much higher at "up to 30%".

== Standards ==
The Guidelines for Canadian Drinking Water Quality of 1968 set guidelines for drinking water quality standards in Canada, developed by Health Canada with the provincial and territorial governments and setting out the maximum acceptable concentrations of these substances in drinking water. The drinking water guidelines are designed to protect the health of the most vulnerable members of society, such as children and the elderly. The guidelines set out the basic parameters that every water system should strive to achieve in order to provide the cleanest, safest and most reliable drinking water possible.

Three Canadian provinces require all public water supplies to be disinfected, while other provinces require disinfection only for surface water supplies.

The standards for used water or wastewater quality came into effect July 18, 2012.

== Regulation of quality ==
Canada's approach to regulating drinking water quality is highly decentralized, with responsibilities shared among federal, provincial/territorial, and municipal governments. Unlike many industrialized nations, Canada does not have legally enforceable drinking water quality standards at the national level.

At the federal level, Health Canada works with the Federal-Provincial-Territorial Committee on Drinking Water to develop the Guidelines for Canadian Drinking Water Quality (GCDWQ). These guidelines establish maximum acceptable concentrations for microbiological, chemical, and radiological contaminants and address physical characteristics of water. However, these guidelines are voluntary and non-enforceable.

Provincial and territorial governments have the primary responsibility for regulating drinking water quality within their jurisdictions. They may adopt the federal guidelines in whole or in part and may choose to make them legally binding or keep them as voluntary guidelines. This has resulted in considerable heterogeneity across Canadian jurisdictions. A comprehensive review found that only 16 of the 94 GCDWQ are consistently applied across all 13 jurisdictions; five jurisdictions use voluntary guidelines, whereas eight use mandatory standards.

Municipalities and water utilities are typically responsible for ensuring that the water they provide meets the regulatory requirements established by their respective provinces or territories. This decentralized approach has been criticized for creating inconsistent drinking water quality standards across Canada, with some advocacy groups calling for national, legally enforceable standards to ensure all Canadians have access to safe drinking water regardless of where they live.

== Responsibility for water supply and sanitation ==
While the responsibility for the provision of water supply and sanitation services in Canada lies with municipalities, the provincial governments and the federal government also have important responsibilities related to the setting of standards, research, economic regulation and water resources management. As all levels of government hold key policy and regulatory levers which apply to water and sanitation, a central challenge is to ensure that these levers are developed and used collaboratively. The Canadian Council of Ministers of the Environment - which consists of the 14 environment ministers from the federal, provincial and territorial governments - plays an important role in the development of national strategies, norms and guidelines for water supply and sanitation.

The need and the difficulty to collaborate between different levels of government is apparent in the discussion of a proposed national municipal wastewater effluents strategy. According to the Canadian Water and Waste Water Association

"Canada faces a variety of provincial and territorial approaches (to wastewater and biosolids) that are not consistent with federal legislation, and we have no structure to have a rational science-based discussion of the policies and regulatory requirements that would enable us to identify and promote the beneficial use of these environmental resources."
T. Duncan Ellison, Executive Director, Canadian Water and Wastewater Association

=== Policies and regulation ===
==== Provinces and territories ====
The governing of drinking water and sanitation in Canada falls under provincial/territorial jurisdiction. The provinces and territories are responsible for developing and enforcing all legislation pertaining to municipal and public water supplies including their construction and operation.

Each province also has a public utility commission or board for the economic regulation of utilities. In many, but not in all provinces, these bodies also regulate tariffs and service quality of water and sewer utilities.

Under the Constitution Act, 1867, the provinces are "owners" of the water resources and have wide responsibilities in their day-to-day management. Each province has its own legislation related to water resources, water supply and the environment.

==== Federal government ====
The federal government has certain specific responsibilities relating to water, such as fisheries and navigation, as well as exercising certain overall responsibilities such as the conduct of external affairs. Within the federal government, over 20 departments and agencies have responsibilities for freshwater. The 1987 Federal Water Policy, which remains valid today, has two main goals with respect to water: To protect and enhance the quality of the water resource and to promote the wise and efficient management and use of water. The Canada Water Act (proclaimed on September 30, 1970) provides the framework for cooperation with provinces and territories in the conservation, development, and utilization of Canada's water resources. The Canadian Environmental Protection Act, 1999, completes the framework for the protection and of water resources. Environment Canada is the federal department (Ministry) in charge of conserving and protecting Canada's water resources. Health Canada is the federal department in charge of protecting the health of all Canadians by developing the Guidelines for Canadian Drinking Water Quality in partnership with the provinces and territories. Housing, Infrastructure and Communities Canada, a department established in 2002, is a focal point for the Government of Canada on infrastructure issues and programs within the larger Transport, Infrastructure and Communities (TIC) portfolio.

=== Service provision ===
Service provision is the responsibility of about 4,000 municipalities. Municipalities in Canada are not mentioned in the constitution and thus depend heavily on provincial governments, which can create or dissolve municipalities, determine municipal responsibilities and what taxes municipalities can levy and set standards for service delivery. Many provinces prohibit municipalities from running an operating deficit and restrict municipal borrowing to capital expenditures, while providing them conditional and unconditional transfers.

While most municipalities provide water and sewer services directly, a few municipalities have delegated service provision to private companies or to public companies owned by Provinces.

For example, the Ontario Clean Water Agency (OCWA), a Crown agency of the province of Ontario, provides operation, maintenance and management services for more than 450 water and waste water treatment facilities in the province on behalf of about 200 Ontario municipalities.

Metro Vancouver provides treated bulk water to its constituent municipalities in Greater Vancouver, and collects and treats their waste water.

Overall there are approximately 9,000 public water and sanitation systems in the country. These include about 2,500 municipally owned water and sewer utilities in urban areas and approximately 6,500 small privately owned and operated systems providing public services in or at trailer parks and recreational facilities such as camp grounds, golf courses and ski facilities, etc.

Human resources Some 300,000 Canadians were directly employed in the operation of these municipal services in the late 1990s, and although statistics are not available for those employed in the private supplier sector, it is likely to be to the same order.

Business associations The Canadian Water and Waste water Association (CWWA), established in 1986, is a non-profit national body representing the common interests of Canada's public sector municipal water and waste water services and their private sector suppliers and partners. CWWA is recognized by the federal government and national bodies as the national voice of this public service sector.

== Tariffs and cost recovery ==
=== Tariff structure ===
In 1999, 44% of Canadian residences served by municipal water systems were not metered. A 2001 study of rate structures by Environment Canada showed that in 1999, 43 percent of the population was under a flat rate structure where the charge or assessment is fixed, regardless of the amount of water used. Another 12 percent were under a declining block rate structure (where the consumer's bill rises at a slower rate as higher volumes of water are used); i.e., the more you use, the less you pay per unit. Thus 55% of Canadians faced residential water use charges that discouraged water conservation. Water use was 70% higher when consumers face flat monthly rates rather than volume-based rates.

Only about 45 percent of the population served was found to be under a rate structure that provided an incentive to conserve water: 36 percent were under a constant rate structure (where the bill to the consumer climbs uniformly with the volume used); and 9 percent were under an increasing block rate structure (where a successively higher price is changed as larger volumes of water are used).

=== Tariff level ===
The price Canadians pay for water varies significantly across the country. Analysis of the 1999 Municipal Water Pricing Survey prepared in 2001 indicates that the average domestic water user (assuming 25 000 liters per month) pays CAN$1.14 for 1000 liters. This value has increased substantially in recent years from about 82 cents per 1000 liters in 1991, and nationally, now includes a waste treatment component of about 39%. The Municipal Water and Waste Water Survey covered over 1200 Canadian municipalities.

List of water and sewer rates in Canada by municipality

=== Cost recovery ===
According to the 1987 federal water policy the federal government is committed to the concept of "a fair value for water." To implement this concept in federal policies, programs and initiatives, the federal government has committed, among other things, to endorse the concept of realistic pricing as a direct means of controlling demand and generating revenues to cover costs.

Nevertheless, in 1999 only 50% of the cost of maintaining and operating water infrastructure was actually being met through cost recovery from users of the systems.

== Investment and financing ==
According to the National Round Table on the Environment and Economy, unmet water and wastewater infrastructure needs in Canada were CAN$38–49 billion in 1996, and capital costs for the following 20 years would be in the order of CAN$70–90 billion.

It was estimated that in the late 1990s the total annual operating cost of water and sanitation services were greater than US$2.75 billion while the revenue generated from user fees is to the order of US$2.1 billion. The difference is made up from general municipal revenues (e.g., property taxes or subsidies from senior levels of government).

The greatest portion of investment in water and sanitation infrastructure and services has been financed by municipal governments from revenues derived from general property taxes or from water and sanitation charges which are increasingly moving to the state of full cost pricing. All Provinces and Territories provide funds via transfers to the municipal governments in their jurisdictions. The federal contribution, while significant in absolute terms (for example, in the period 1993 to 1998 the amount was in excess of US$1.4 billion), represents only a small proportion of total public investments in municipal infrastructure.

=== Provincial financing ===
Provinces provide both conditional grants (more than 80%) and unconditional grants (less than 20%) to municipalities. Conditional grants can either be lump-sum payments (non-matching transfers) or matching grants. Matching grants provide a certain percentage of financing that varies among Provinces and programs, while requiring the balance to be paid by the municipality.

=== Federal financing ===
Housing, Infrastructure and Communities Canada manages a number of federal funds financing investments in Canada's infrastructure. None of these funds is dedicated exclusively to water supply and sanitation. The funds managed by the department include three funds under the Building Canada program:

- CAN$8.8 billion for the Building Canada Fund (BCF), which is being used for Core National Highway Systems, drinking water, waste water, public transit and green energy, as well as other projects;
- CAN$25 million a year in base funding to each province and territory, for a total of $2.275 billion over seven years; and
- CAN$11.8 billion for the Gas Tax Fund, which invests in municipal infrastructure that contributes to cleaner air, cleaner water and reduced greenhouse gas emissions and supports better community planning.

== See also ==
- Water pollution in Canada
