= Moses West =

American engineer

Moses West is an American United States Army officer, test pilot and self taught engineer who innovated the quality, lowered the energy consumption, increased the water output of the atmospheric water generator (AWG) which uses condensation in the air to generate clean water for people for whom water safety is an issue.

== Career ==
After serving in the United States Army, West turned to addressing water scarcity. In 2015, he founded the Atmospheric Water Generation Company and later established the Moses West Foundation to bring this technology to communities in need, particularly in disaster-struck and marginalized areas.
