= Source Protection Committees =

Canadian provincial government committee

Source Protection Committees were established under the Province of Ontario’s Clean Water Act, 2006 to create and carry out a plan to protect municipal sources of drinking water.

There are 19 Source Protection Committees in Ontario, with representatives from the public, economic and municipal sectors.

Source protection committees meet regularly and work towards the completion of three major pieces of work: - Terms of Reference - Assessment Report - Source Protection Plan

The CTC Source Protection Committee is composed of 21 members and represents the watersheds contained within the Credit Valley, Toronto and Region and Central Lake Ontario Conservation Authorities - see Conservation Authority (Canada). This area includes the municipalities of Toronto, Peel Region, Durham Region, York Region and parts of Wellington County, Halton Region and Dufferin County.
