= Source water protection =

Protection of drinking water sources from overuse and contamination

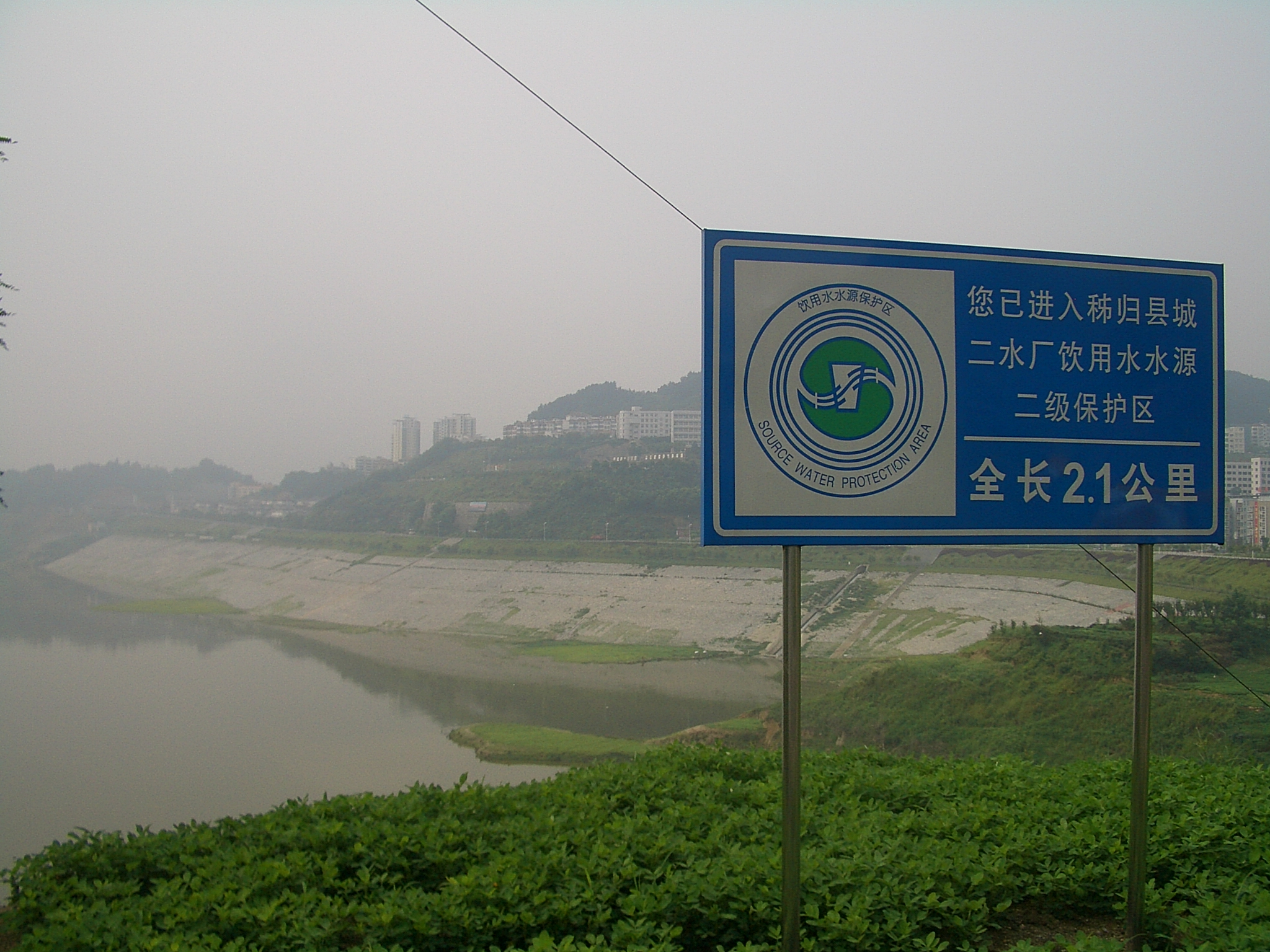
Water source protection area on the Three Gorges Reservoir in Maoping Town, Zigui County, Hubei, China

Source water protection is a planning process conducted by local water utilities, as well as regional or national government agencies, to protect drinking water sources from overuse and contamination. The process includes identification of water sources, assessment of known and potential threats of contamination, notification of the public, and steps to eliminate the contamination. The process is applicable to lakes, rivers and groundwater (aquifers).

== Canada ==
Source water protection is part of a multi-barrier approach to protecting municipal sources of drinking water that was recommended by the Canadian Justice Dennis O'Connor in his Walkerton reports. This study was released in 2002 as a response to the Walkerton Tragedy, in which the town of Walkerton, Ontario's drinking water became contaminated with E. coli bacteria.

== United States ==
The Safe Drinking Water Act requires each state to delineate the boundaries of areas that public water systems use for their sources of drinking water—both surface and underground sources. The U.S. Environmental Protection Agency (EPA) encourages states and local water utilities to conduct source water assessments and take steps to protect the sources. EPA provides some financial assistance to states and utilities to conduct source water planning, through the Drinking Water State Revolving Fund. Technical and financial assistance is also available through the agency's Water Infrastructure and Resiliency Finance Center.

== Methods for source water protection ==
A recent study have also explored the integration of ecosystem service assessments into source water protection and drinking water risk management, extending the application of ecosystem service frameworks to drinking water resources.

== See also ==
- Watershed management
