= Ontario Clean Water Agency =

- French: Agence ontarienne des eaux

Agency overview
- Formed: 1990
- Jurisdiction: Government of Ontario
- Headquarters: 2085 Hurontario Street; Suite 500; Mississauga, Ontario; L5A 4G1
- Minister responsible: Todd McCarthy, Minister of the Environment, Conservation and Parks
- Agency executive: Debbie Korolnek, Chair
- Key document: Capital Investment Plan Act
- Website: https://ocwa.com

The Ontario Clean Water Agency (OCWA) is a Crown agency of the Government of Ontario that provides operation, maintenance and management services for more than 450 water and wastewater treatment facilities in the province.

== History ==
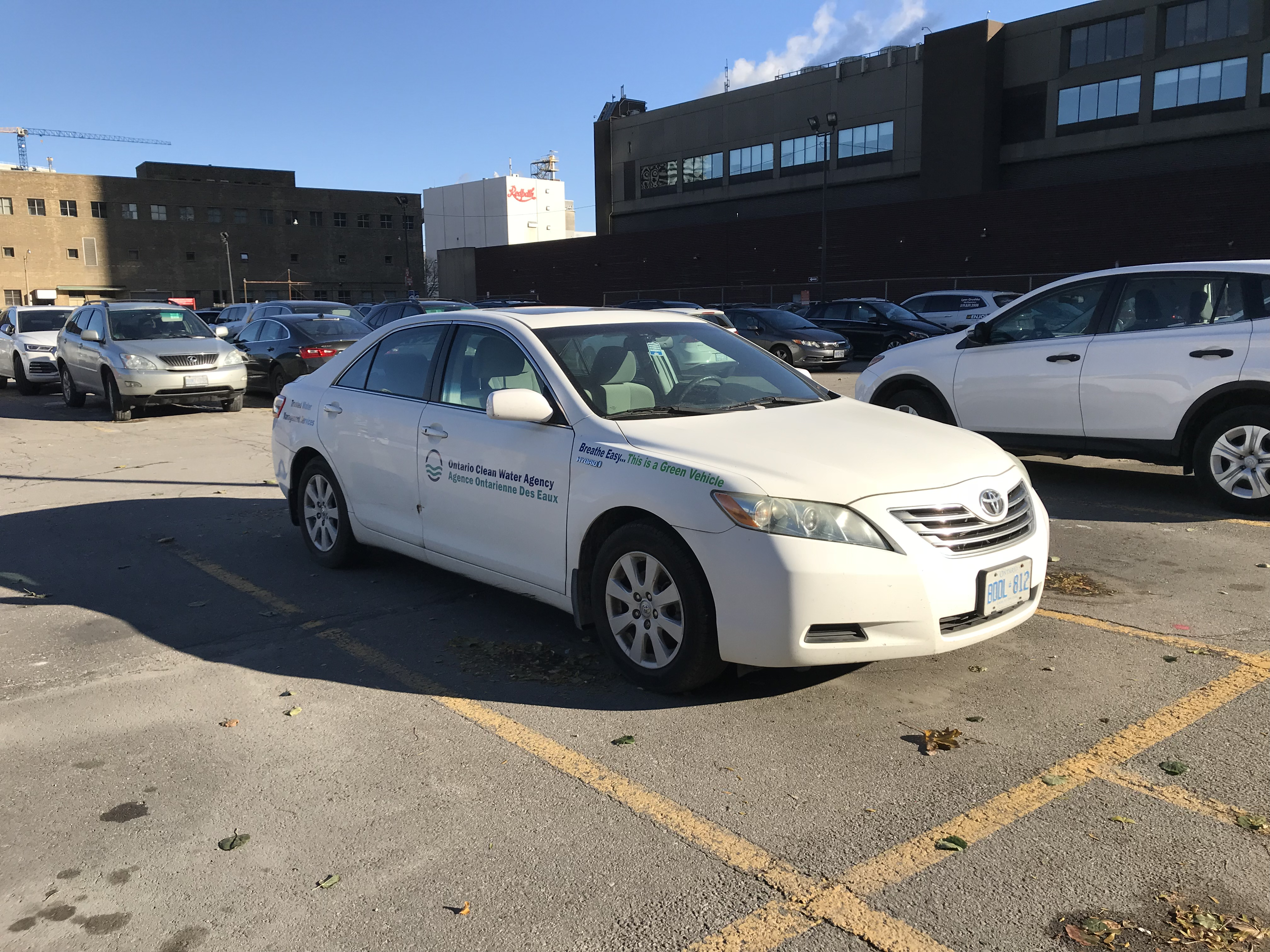
An Ontario Clean Water Agency hybrid vehicle

OCWA was created in 1993 by the NDP government of Premier Bob Rae under the Ontario Capital Investment Plan Act and initially took over provincial ownership of 153 water-treatment plants and 77 sewage-treatment facilities. It also operated 116 municipally owned water and sewage facilities.

By 1996, it had 800 employees and held contracts to operate 429 facilities in the province, comprising 25 per cent of Ontario's water-treatment plants and 57 per cent of the wastewater-treatment plants. In October of that year, the Progressive Conservative government under Premier Mike Harris, which came to power in 1995, announced its plans to turn ownership of the facilities over to the municipalities and privatize OCWA as an environmental consulting firm.

Ownership of the facilities was transferred to the municipalities, but OCWA was not sold. It was transformed into a management services organization and in 1998 won what was then Canada's largest water and wastewater operations and maintenance contract—a 10-year, $213 million deal to operate the South Peel system. By 2000, OCWA operated and maintained more than 300 municipally owned water and sewage treatment facilities on behalf of about 200 Ontario municipalities.

== Walkerton tragedy ==
In May 2000, an outbreak of E. coli contamination occurred in the water system of Walkerton, Ontario. In the aftermath of the disaster and the ensuing reforms to water treatment, the OCWA was put in charge of the cleanup of the water supply system of the town. This included a complete flushing of all the pipes in Walkerton, including those located in every building in the town.

== See also ==
- Water supply and sanitation in Canada
