= Water safety plan =

A water safety plan is a plan to ensure the safety of drinking water through the use of a comprehensive risk assessment and risk management approach that encompasses all steps in water supply from catchment to consumer.

== Origins ==
According to the World Health Organization, "During the revision of the World Health Organization (WHO) Guidelines for Drinking-water Quality (GDWQ) leading to the 3rd edition, the value of the Water Safety Plan (WSP) approach has repeatedly been highlighted ... in a series of expert review meetings in Berlin (2000), Adelaide (2001) and Loughborough (2001)."

Water safety plans are considered by the WHO as the most effective means of maintaining a safe supply of drinking water to the public. Their use should ensure that water is safe for all forms of human consumption and that it meets regulatory water standards relating to human health. ("Consumption" includes not only drinking per se, but also other forms of ordinary contact, such as bathing, dishwashing, and inhaling aerosolised water droplets). Comprehensive risk assessment and risk management form the backbone of these plans, which aim to steer management of drinking water-related health risks away from end-of-pipe monitoring and response.

The principles and concepts of other risk management paradigms are extensively drawn upon in WSP design, including the multi-barrier approach and HACCP^{[1]}.

In order to produce a plan, a thorough assessment of the water supply process from water source to the consumer's tap must be carried out by the water provider. Hazards and risks should be identified, and appropriate steps towards minimizing these risks are then investigated.

== Key components ==
There are three key components to any Water Safety Plan (WSP):

1. a system assessment, which determines if the drinking water supply chain as a whole is capable of supplying water of sufficiently high a standard to meet regulatory targets;
2. operational monitoring, in order to identify control measures in the drinking water system; and
3. management plans, which document the system assessment, describe actions taken during various operational conditions and define monitoring and communication plans.

== WSPs in England and Wales ==
The Drinking Water Inspectorate (DWI) of England and Wales strongly supports the WHO's WSP initiative and offers guidance and support to water suppliers on the implementation of these plans.

The Department of Health give clear guidance on the creation and implementation of water safety plans for hospitals in their HTM 04-01 – safe water in healthcare premises.

A new British Standard (2020) gives recommendations and guidance on the development of a Water Safety Plan (WSP). The standard is intended to be used as a code of practice to demonstrate current good practice and compliance. BS 8680:2020 Water quality. Water safety plans. Code of practice

== Key steps ==
1. Assemble expert team - a group that is responsible to prepare and have documents of the process
2. Hazard assessment - identify hazards at every step of the supply chain
3. Risk assessment - carried out a hazard affecting the water supply system
4. Identify control measurements - identify control measures for every risk that is relevant
5. Management control - control the system regularly and check for fails
6. Validation monitoring - prepare to verify the monitoring check of WSP
7. Supporting programmes- develop people's skills, quality control and knowledge of water safety
8. All of the above - all elements of the WSP

== Small water supply ==
Small supplies are associated with waterborne disease outbreaks more than larger water supply systems. Small supplies are typically more prone to collapse and spoilage than massive water supply systems and often face more administrative, financial or resource challenges. Looking to invest in small supplies of water will minimize outbreaks of waterborne disease and overall costs in terms of preventing disease, death, and associated costs of healthcare.

- Food safety
- ISO 14001
- Water quality

== See also ==
- Water security
