= Water Conservation Act of 2009 =

The Water Conservation Act of 2009 (also known as Senate Bill X7-7 or SB X7-7) is a California state law that requires the state to reduce urban water consumption by 20% by the year 2020. It originated as a bill written by Democratic Senator Darrell Steinberg and was enacted on November 10, 2009. The key purpose of the law is to encourage both urban and agricultural water providers to implement conservation strategies, monitor water usage, and report data to the Department of Water Resources (DWR). The law sets goals and deadlines regarding when the implementations must occur and, in an attempt to encourage participation, makes water suppliers ineligible for state water grants or loans unless certain terms have been met.

== Details ==
=== Formula for implementation ===
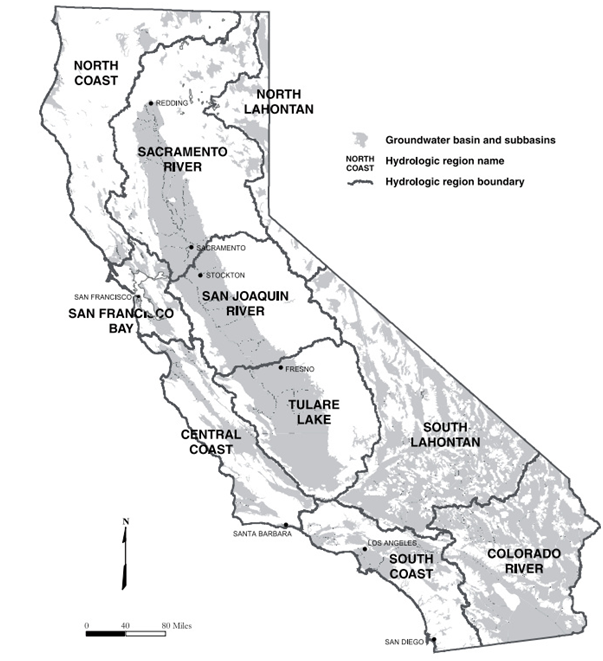
Hydrologic regions of California

Water providers were first required to submit assessments of their baseline urban water use, which was measured in gallons per capita per day (GPCD), to the California Department of Water Resources (DWR). From this it was possible to calculate the reductions in use that would be required for each watershed, taking account of different factors such as population, hydrology and land use, in order to meet the required 20% reduction.

All providers were then required to submit conservation plans to DWR by July 1, 2011 outlining exactly how the provider will ensure the conservation targets are met. To aide the suppliers the DWR formulated several water conversation methods/measurement criteria that suppliers could adopt, allowing them to choose the one that was best suited to their specific users. These included:

- Setting a conservation target of 80 percent of their baseline daily per capita water use (i.e. a direct 20% reduction in all water use).
- Differentiate between specific land uses (indoor, landscape, commercial and industrial) and set different performance standards.
- Meet the per-capita water use goal for their specific hydrologic region as identified by DWR and other state agencies.
- Use an alternate method that was developed by DWR before December 31, 2010.

Agricultural Water providers are also bound by the legislation and will be required to:

- Measure the volume of water delivered to customers
- Adopt a pricing structure that is based on quantity delivered.

== See also ==
- Water in California
- California Department of Water Resources
