= New Brunswick environmental legislation =

The province of New Brunswick has created and implemented various Acts, such as the Clean Environment Act, Clean Air Act, and the Clean Water Act, throughout history to ensure that the environment is considered and protected throughout various project. These acts describe the process that will be undertaken to assess the impact of projects, and the steps to be taken when certain situations arise.

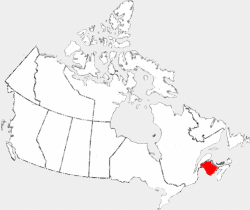
New Brunswick

== Overview ==
On a general scale, environmental acts are enacted by the Minister of Environment and require anyone who is disposing a contaminant to first receive approval from the Minister. These Acts give the Minister the power to control and/or stop the disposal of contaminants, and the ability to enforce laws that require individual to clean up contaminated site. Within these acts are the regulations on how to apply and receive approval. Within each act, there are various smaller acts that are directed at specific aspects of the environment or how to deal with specific contaminants. In total, within this legislative framework there are seven statues and 19 regulations.

Within the Clean Environment Act, the Clean Air Act, and the Clean Water Act, there exists an Appeal Regulation that allows an individual to appeal the Minister's decision within 15 days of the initial judgement. The appealant must submit to the Minister a document outlining the reasons for the appeal and any supporting documents within 30 days of making the appeal.

== Clean Environment Act ==
The Clean Environment Act contains many regulations that are centred on dealing with materials and actions that can contaminate the physical environment. It includes above and below surface level.

=== Environmental impact assessment ===
New Brunswick's Environmental Impact Assessment Regulation 87-83 was established in 1987. The Minister of the Department of the Environment and local government are responsible for overseeing it and it falls under the Clean Environment Act. Implementation of the regulation is the responsibility of the Project Assessment Branch.

==== Types of review ====
Determination review

All proposed projects that meet the criteria listed in Schedule A (below) must undergo a determination review. The purpose of a determination review is to evaluate and determine the environmental issues and concerns associated with the proposed project.

The first step of the determination review is for the proponent to submit an outline that describes the project in detail, the existing environmental problems or concerns for that area, the potential environmental issues that may arise during the project, the action plan for if problems do occur that will eliminate or reduce the environmental impact. Once the outline is submitted it is presented to the public for consultation. The next step is for it to undergo a technical review, which is done by the Project Assessment Branch of the Department of the Environment and Local Government alongside a Technical Review Committee (TRC) which is composed of experts from various federal and provincial departments. Depending on the project location, experts may also be involved from municipalities or the District Planning Committee. The last step is to submit all the documents to the Minister. The minister then issues one of three actions:

1. Approval – the proposed project can continue forward
2. Denied – the proposed project is denied. It can not move forward. The proponent needs to reassess the project.
3. Further study needed – the proposed project must undergo further study. It will be submitted for a Comprehensive review.

Comprehensive review

A comprehensive review takes place when the Minister decides that a proposal submitted for determination review needs further study. After announcing this decision he must release Draft Guidelines to the public within 60 days for review and input. These guidelines outline what the purpose of the review is, and the specific aspects and issues that are to be considered. After the public has had a chance to give input the revised proposal and suggestions are given back to the proponent. The proponent responds to the changes and suggestions, and submits a draft of the revised project to the Minister. After pursuing the draft the Minister submits a recommendation to the Lieutenant-Governor-in-Council for approval or denial.

==== Schedule A (triggers) ====
(a)all commercial extraction or processing of a mineral as defined in the Mining Act;

(b)all electric power generating facilities with a production rating of three megawatts or more;

(c)all water reservoirs with a storage capacity of more than ten million cubic metres;

(d)all electric power transmission lines exceeding sixty-nine thousand volts in capacity or five kilometres in length;

(e)all linear communications transmission systems exceeding five kilometres in length;

(f)all commercial extraction or processing of combustible energy-yielding materials, except fuel wood;

(g)all offshore drilling for, or extraction of, oil, natural gas or minerals;

(h)all pipelines exceeding five kilometres in length, except

1. (i)water, steam or domestic waste water pipelines, and
2. (ii)pipelines or pipe lines that are the subject of an application under the Gas Distribution Act or the Pipe Line Act;

(i)all causeways and multiple-span bridges;

(j)all major highway projects involving either a significant length of new highway alignment or a major upgrading or widening of an existing highway resulting in a change in its intended use or classification;

(k)all facilities for the commercial processing or treatment of timber resources other than fuel wood, except maple sugaries, shingle mills and sawmills producing less than one hundred thousand foot board measure annually;

(l)all programs or commercial ventures involving the introduction into New Brunswick of plant or animal species which are not indigenous to New Brunswick;

(m)all waste disposal facilities or systems;

(m.1)all disposal, destruction, recycling, reprocessing or storage of waste that originates outside New Brunswick and all facilities or systems for the disposal, destruction, recycling, reprocessing or storage of such waste;

(n)all sewage disposal or sewage treatment facilities, other than domestic, on-site facilities;

(o)all provincial or national parks;

(p)all major recreational or tourism developments, including developments which consist of changing the use of land so that it is used for recreational or tourism purposes;

(q)all ports, harbours, railroads or airports;

(r)all projects involving the transfer of water between drainage basins;

(s)all waterworks with a capacity greater than fifty cubic metres of water daily;

(t)all major residential developments outside incorporated areas;

(u)all enterprises, activities, projects, structures, works or programs affecting any unique, rare or endangered feature of the environment;

(v)all enterprises, activities, projects, structures, works or programs affecting two hectares or more of bog, marsh, swamp or other wetland;

(w)all facilities for the processing of radioactive materials

=== Petroleum product storage and handling regulations ===
These regulations provide guidelines on the standards that must be met when designing and constructing petroleum storage tanks. These regulations requires individuals to register and licence a storage system that has a hold capacity of two thousand litres or more. The fees for licensing is between $10 and $500 a year depending on the type of licence needed. Within this regulation is also the requirements that an individual must fulfill in order to be licensed for installing petroleum systems.

=== Tire Stewardship Regulations ===
The Tire Stewardship Regulations establish the New Brunswick Tire Stewardship Board, who run the stewardship program outlined and approved by the Minister of Environment. In total, the board and regulations are responsible for the collection and disposal of used tires.

=== Regional Solid Waste Commissions Regulation ===
These regulations outline the financial management, auditing, and reporting procedures requirements in relation to solid waste commissions. They also outline what commissions may accept and provide service in regards to solid waste management.

=== Water Quality Regulation ===
The Water Quality Regulation largely applies to industrial operations. It provides guidelines for applicants to follow before submitting their project for approval to the Minister. Once the project is submitted it undergoes an environmental review. If approval is granted, the applicant will be given conditions to follow that will control construction and operating activities and the amount of contaminants which the facility may dispose of.

== Clean Air Act ==
The Clean Air Act is the most recently created act and it expands off the Clean Environment Act and the Clean Water Act. It allows for increased public opinion for reviews that relate to projects and contracts involving air emissions.

=== Air Quality Regulation ===
The Air Quality Regulation operates in a similar way to the Water Quality Regulation. It outlines how to submit your plan for approval and the guidelines that will have to be followed if approval is given. It controls how much of a contaminate the facility will be allowed to release into the air.

=== Ozone Depleting Substance Regulation ===
This regulation controls and places restrictions on substances which have a damaging effect on the stratospheric ozone layer. The regulation strives to prevent the release of the damaging substances by enforcing restrictions on how to dispose of and recycle the substance as well as controlling what the substances are used for. All technicians that will be handling the substances, or performing work on machines that contain the substances must undergo an ODS certification course. Both the provincial and federal government play a part in this regulation. The provincial government has the responsibility of controlling the use of the substances, while the federal government is in control of the manufacturing, importing, and exporting of the substances. Within this regulation is a support on both the national and international level to allow the recovery of the ozone layer by eliminating the use of all harmful substances.

=== Administrative Penalties Regulation ===
The Administrative Penalties Regulation provides guidelines for what penalties may be imposed for offences that are listed within the regulation. The degree of the penalty is determined by various factors, such as the number of steps that were taken to prevent the offence and the history of the individual in regards to past offences. The penalty is usually delivered in the form of a fine ranging from $200 to $5000. An individual may only pay a penalty for offences that are similar in nature three times before other enforcement actions will be taken.

== Clean Water Act ==
=== Fees for Industrial Approvals Regulation ===
Once a facility or project has approval under the Water Quality Regulation, this regulation will impose on them an annual fee ranging from $100 to $42,000.

=== Potable Water Regulation ===
The Potable Water Regulation ensures that any water intended for human consumption meets the quality standards established by the Department of Environment and the Department of Health and Community Services. Within this regulation are guidelines for well drillers which makes the testing of potability in newly constructed wells mandatory. It also ensures that public water is tested on a regular schedule and that the results of the test are submitted to the Minister of Health and Community Services.

=== Water Well Regulation ===
Related to the Portable Water Regulation, the Water Well Regulation provides standards that must be met when constructing new wells. It also outlines the requirements that must be met in order to obtain a permit, fees that will need to be paid, how to get a well drillers certificate. It makes it mandatory to report to the Minister the rate of yield of a well.

=== Protected Area Designation Order ===
The Protected Area Designation Order is also referred to as the Water Course Setback Designation Order. It was designed to protect the surface water by establish 'protected areas' consisting of the area 75 metres from streams, lakes, ponds, and so on that are used for public drinking. It controls how the land within those areas is used and prevents the disposal of contaminants in the area.

=== Protected Area Exemption Regulation ===
This regulation was created so as to provide criteria whereby exemptions for the Protected Area Designation Order may be issued.

=== Watercourse Alteration Regulation ===
A watercourse is defined in this regulation as anything that contains water, such as lakes, streams, rivers and ponds. The purpose of the regulation is to protect these areas from activities that will cause unnecessary harm that affects the function of the watercourse. Individuals wishing to perform an activity that could cause unnecessary harm, such as building a bridge or cutting trees with 30 metres of the watercourse, must first obtain permission in the form of a permit from the Minister. This permit will outline what may be done, how it may be done, and the time of the year that it is allowed to be done. There are limitations to this regulation, such as that it does not apply to areas where a large river meets the ocean, such as below the Reversing Falls on the Saint John River.

== Other legislation ==
=== Environmental Trust Fund Act ===
The Environmental Trust Fund Act established a fund which can be used for a various things which are outlined within the Act, such as promoting sustainable development, education about the environment, and conservation. The funds are gained through the saving of part of the fees collected under the Beverage Containers Act and donations. The Act requires the Minister of Environment to designate a board to advise him/her on how the fund should be used.

=== Pesticide Control Act ===
The Pesticide Control Act was created to regulates the use and disposal of pesticides in an appropriate and approved of manner.

There are a limited amounts of pesticides that have been approved for use in New Brunswick. In order to sell these pesticides the companies must hold a Pesticide Vendor's License, and companies that offer services in regards to the use of pesticides must have a Pesticide Operator's License. These companies offering services involved with pesticide must hold a permit issued by the Minister of Environment, and each employee must have appropriate training and certification as listed out in this regulation. If the company is offering their service for applying pesticide from an aircraft, or to water, they must hold a separate Pesticide Use Permit. A Private Pesticide Applicator's Certificate is needed for an individual who wish to apply a pesticide to their own land or employer's land.

=== Unsightly Premises Act ===
The Unsightly Premises Act establishes guidelines surrounding the up keep of property. It prohibits individuals from allowing their property to overcome by garbage and appear unsightly to the general public. It outlines how the property owner should be notified the approved methods for enforcing the Act.

=== Beverage Containers Act ===
The Beverage Containers Act contains the guidelines on how to establish and maintain the deposit/refund system for beverage containers.

Under the General Regulation are the requirements surrounding the size and labeling of the containers. It establishes the procedures at recycling plants, also known as Redemption Centres, about how they are to operate, fees, and how/how much of the fees are to be sent to the Environmental Trust Fund.

== See also ==
- Environmental law
- Heritage Conservation Act (New Brunswick)
