= Dennis O'Connor (judge) =

Canadian judge

Dennis R. O'Connor OC OOnt
- Education: De La Salle College; Osgoode Hall Law School
- Alma mater: York University
- Occupations: Judge, lawyer
- Employer: Borden Ladner Gervais
- Known for: Associate Chief Justice of Ontario; Walkerton Inquiry; Maher Arar Inquiry
- Awards: Order of Canada; Order of Ontario

Dennis R. O'Connor, OC OOnt was the Associate Chief Justice of Ontario from 2001–2012 and sat on the Court of Appeal for Ontario from 1998–2012.

== Activity ==
O'Connor attended De La Salle College and Osgoode Hall Law School of York University in Toronto, Ontario. He practised law from 1973 until 1976. From 1976 to 1980, he was a teacher at the University of Western Ontario Faculty of Law and subsequently practised litigation at Borden, Elliot in Toronto. Between 1980-1984, he was a negotiator for the Government of Canada in the Yukon land claims process.

He was appointed to the Ontario Court of Appeal in 1998, and was elevated to Associate Chief Justice of Ontario in 2001.

He was appointed Commissioner in the Walkerton Inquiry in 2000, and was Commissioner in the Maher Arar Inquiry from 2004 to 2006.

On August 12, 2013, Toronto police chief Bill Blair announced, that he had requested O'Connor conduct an internal review into the use of force by police.

On June 30, 2016, O'Connor was made an Officer of the Order of Canada by Governor General David Johnston for "his service to the legal profession and for his commitment to justice as a commissioner of the Walkerton and Arar inquiries." In 2016, he was made a member of the Order of Ontario.

As of March 2025, O'Connor was senior counsel at Borden Ladner Gervais. That month, he submitted a report to the Law Society of Ontario concluding that a 2024 salary increase for the regulator's CEO made by its former treasurer and current judge Jacqueline Horvat without consulting the society's benchers was problematic.

== See also ==
- Maher Arar
