= Walkerton E. coli outbreak =

2000 water contamination in Ontario, Canada

Coordinates: 44°08′N 81°09′W

- Pathogen: Escherichia coli O157:H7 and Campylobacter jejuni
- Source: Contaminated drinking water supplies
- Location: Walkerton, Ontario, Canada
- First reported: May 17, 2000
- Date: May 12–24, 2000
- Confirmed cases: 2,000+
- Severe cases: 27
- Deaths: 7

The Walkerton E. coli outbreak was the result of a contamination of the drinking water supply of Walkerton, Ontario, Canada with E. coli and Campylobacter jejuni bacteria. The water supply was contaminated as a result of improper water treatment following heavy rainfall in late April and early May 2000, that had drawn bacteria from the manure of nearby cattle used to fertilize crops into the shallow aquifer of a nearby well. The first reported case was on May 17. The contamination caused gastroenteritis and sickened more than 2,000 people and resulted in seven deaths, and left others with chronic illnesses.

Subsequently, Associate Chief Justice of Ontario, Dennis O'Connor led an inquiry into the outbreak, called the Walkerton Inquiry. Walkerton Public Utilities Commission operators Stan and Frank Koebel, neither of whom had any formal training, were sentenced on December 20, 2004, after pleading guilty to charges of common nuisance stemming from the contamination—Stan to one year in jail, and Frank to nine months house arrest. As a result, stricter water treatment guidelines were put in place by the government.

== Background ==
Walkerton, Ontario is a small township in the municipality of Brockton, 180 kilometres (110 mi) northwest of Toronto. It serves as the administrative centre of Brockton, into which it was merged in 1999, and as the county seat of Bruce County. The population of Walkerton in 1996 was recorded as 5,036 individuals in an area of 6.4 square kilometres (2.5 sq mi). At the time of the 2000 events, the town's drinking water was drawn from three chlorinated wells to the west and southwest of the town. The wells were owned and operated by the Walkerton Public Utilities Commission (PUC), which was managed by Stan Koebel and run by foreman Frank Koebel.

=== Walkerton Public Utilities Commission ===
System operators

In 2000, the Walkerton Public Utilities Commission was under the supervision of two men, brothers Stan and Frank Koebel. Both men had been working for the Walkerton Public Utilities Commission (PUC) since the 1970s, when they were teenagers and their father worked at the PUC. Neither man had formal training in public utility operation or in water management, but by 2000, both had been promoted to management positions on the basis of their experience. Both brothers carried certification as class 3 water distribution system operators, licences obtained through a grandfathering program run by the Ministry of the Environment (MOE) and based on their work experience in their positions. Though Ontario law required that water systems operators receive 40 hours of continuing education per year, Stan Koebel interpreted this to include activities only marginally related to water systems, such as CPR certification, and as a result neither brother used continuing education time to gain or maintain expertise in water safety.

As a result of their lack of formal training and their overseeing themselves, the Koebel brothers were relatively uninformed about water safety. Both later testified that they were not familiar with sections of the Ontario Drinking Water Standards documentation (ODWS) that dealt with tasks they needed to be aware of to do their jobs adequately; manager Stan Koebel had not read the section of the ODWS about identifying contaminated water, while foreman Frank Koebel had not read the chapter on chemical testing of water for safety purposes. Neither man had more than a passing familiarity with E. coli or the danger the bacteria posed to water systems, nor with chlorination standards and best practices.

Well system and maintenance

The wells that drew water for Walkerton were known as Well 5, Well 6, and Well 7, with Well 5 being both the southernmost and the closest to the residential portion of the township. Well 5, drawing water from depths of 5.5 to 5.8 metres (18.0 to 19.0 ft) and 7.0 to 7.3 metres (23.0 to 24.0 ft) through soft limestone, was brought online to the Walkerton water system in 1978, following a hydrological evaluation commissioned by the PUC. Because Well 5's aquifer drew partially from spring-fed, gravel-soiled zones that were prone to absorbing surface runoff, the hydrological evaluation recommended that Well 5 be monitored regularly to ensure that water was being drawn from lower well depths rather than higher ones. It also recommended that land usage in the immediate area of the well be limited in light of agricultural waste runoff being detectable in the well's water. Neither of these recommendations was implemented as conditions of operation when Well 5 received a Certificate of Approval in 1979. Multiple subsequent tests on the well between 1979 and 2000 continued to conclude that due to the shallow depth at which Well 5 was drilled and the tendency of its water level and makeup to be directly affected by surface runoff, caution toward contamination levels in the well was advisable. Wells 6 and 7 were drilled deeper and drew from areas of land with significantly less fractured bedrock than well 5.

In 2000, Ontario law indicated that in a community the size of Walkerton, at least thirteen water samples per month should be submitted for microbiological testing, with the samples being drawn from "the point at which the treated water enters the distribution system". A longstanding standard at the Walkerton PUC, however, was to comply with an earlier governmental requirement of nine samples per month. Employees were instructed to collect four weekly samples from each of the three wells that served Walkerton. This meant that even in an ideal month, the PUC typically submitted one fewer sample than required by law; in practice, it was more common for eight or nine samples to be submitted than for thirteen to be. In addition, the samples that were submitted often had their points of origin mislabelled; for the sake of convenience, testing employees might draw two samples from one location but label the bottles as having come from two locations, or draw a water sample from the water supply of their own home rather than from within distribution points of the system. As a result, not all water sources were being tested adequately, and there was little regularity to which ones were tested when. Multiple Ministry of the Environment (MOE) documents dating to throughout the 1990s note that Walkerton's sampling practices were lacking. Walkerton was placed on a list of non-compliant municipalities in 1997, but removed shortly thereafter after assurances from Stan Koebel that compliance would improve. Nevertheless, a 1998 inspection verified that eight or nine samples were still the standard of collection in Walkerton. The PUC was again warned about noncompliance, and again Stan Koebel agreed to improve testing practices.

MOE reports throughout the 1990s also noted that the PUC was inadequately chlorinating water that ran through the Walkerton system. Best practices dictated that chlorine residual levels after fifteen minutes of contact between the chlorine and the water be maintained at 0.5 mg/L, with that level verified through daily testing; this would indicate that the water was being adequately purified of potentially harmful microorganisms. Inspections of the Walkerton system in 1991, 1995, and 1998 showed chlorine residual levels in the Walkerton system of between 0.12 mg/L and 0.4 mg/L, with a mean level of 0.27 mg/L. According to the later Walkerton Inquiry, "Stan Koebel testified that he generally set the chlorinator to slightly less than 0.5 mg/L and that Frank Koebel would lower it to approximately 0.3 mg/L several times a month." Both men felt that Walkerton water was adequately pure and safe without a 0.5 mg/L chlorine residual—they were known to willingly drink raw water from the wells—and they had received complaints from community members about system water tasting overly chlorinated. The PUC's evaluation of chlorine residual levels was typically performed weekly, rather than daily, and actual testing was often eschewed in favour of visually inspecting the "bubble" on the chlorinator for a "guesstimate" of the residual. These "guesstimates" would be noted in the PUC's daily operating sheets as if they were actual tested levels. When actual testing was performed, the 15-minute timeframe of the test was often cut short, resulting in higher-than-reality chlorine residual readings.

Fecal coliform and E. coli testing on Well 5 between 1990 and 2000 showed ongoing deterioration in the quality of water from the well. In the mid-1990s, a provision for more intensive monitoring of wells susceptible to groundwater contamination was added to the Ontario Drinking Water Objectives (ODWO); however, the Ministry of the Environment (MOE) failed to apply this provision to reclassifying existing wells. As a result, despite tests repeatedly showing that Well 5 was prone to contamination, it did not have any contamination alarms or emergency shut-off mechanisms. April 2000 sampling done on water from Wells 5 and 6 showed fecal coliform present in Well 5's water, both raw and treated, but not in Well 6's. Well 7 was not running during this time period and was not tested. May 1, 2000 tests showed similar results, with Well 5 being the sole apparent contaminated water source.

May 15 water testing on the Highway 9 water main construction project in Walkerton returned positive results for fecal coliform and E. coli. Due to inaccurate labelling of the samples' sources by PUC personnel, it was unclear to the testing laboratory which water samples had come from Walkerton's raw water versus its treated water, or which water had come from which well source; however, the laboratory notified Stan Koebel on May 17 that submitted samples had tested positive for E. coli and fecal coliform. Personnel from the testing laboratory, unaware that Ontario Drinking Water Objectives mandated the notification of the Ministry of the Environment in such a case, did not notify any agency besides the PUC of the failed testing results.

=== Contamination period ===
Using knowledge about typical incubation periods of E. coli O157:H7 (average 3–4 days) and Campylobacter (average 2–5 days) bacteria and working backwards from the first emergence of symptoms in the community, investigators determined that the majority of infected community members had been exposed to the bacteria between May 13 and May 16 and the contamination had thus likely entered the infective well on or about May 12.

In the spring of 2000, Walkerton's system typically drew most of its water from one well at a time, alternating unevenly between wells 5, 6, and 7. Well 7 was turned off between March 10 and May 2, ran alone from May 2 through May 9 before turning off again, and was then used again between May 15 and May 19. From May 9 to May 13, Well 5 provided the bulk of Walkerton's water, supplemented from May 10–13 by Well 6. (Note: Details for Well 6's pumpage between May 14 and May 18 were improperly recorded and could not be used as sources for investigations concerning the contamination.) Though Well 7 ran without chlorination between May 3 and May 9, expert evaluation of well 7's pumping schedule and lack of physical vulnerabilities to contamination concluded that it was highly unlikely to have been involved in the outbreak. Well 6, which records indicate was out of service beginning May 13, was similarly determined to have been unlikely to have been the source of contamination based on its location and characteristics.

=== Source of contamination ===
To the immediate south and west of Well 5 lay farmland used as a cattle-breeding operation, occupying four lots (18–21, west to east). On April 22, 2000, following heavy rainfall on April 20–21, manure from the cattle was used to fertilize crops growing on lot 20 of the property, the nearest edge of which lay approximately 81 metres (266 ft) from Well 5. The manure was subsequently incorporated into the soil of lot 20 using a disc harrow.

The April incorporation of E. coli-contaminated manure into cool, wet soil near Well 5 meant that the bacteria were in an ideally suited environment for longevity. Subsequent heavy rains totalling 134 millimetres (5.3 in) fell between May 8 and May 12, drawing the bacteria deeper into the soil near Well 5. During later investigations of the outbreak, experts on the Walkerton Commission Expert Review Panel determined that the manure-contaminated water had likely seeped into the aquifer that underlay Well 5, though it may have been possible that surface runoff, rather than contaminated groundwater, was the source of the bacteria.

Cattle manure, even under best practices, typically contains fecal coliform bacteria, including E. coli. A subsequent government report concluded that the cattle operation had followed all safety and husbandry best practices with regard to manure storage and use, and that though the E. coli contamination had almost certainly come from the farm's manure usage, the farm's operator was not at fault for contamination of the well.

== Outbreak ==
Beginning May 17, 2000, absenteeism in the Walkerton school system took an upswing. That day, the Walkerton Hospital treated seven children suffering from gastrointestinal ailments involving cramping and diarrhea. The illnesses were not initially recognized as part of a pattern, and no report was made to the Bruce-Grey-Owen Sound Health Unit, which was responsible for public health in Grey and Bruce counties.

On May 18, twenty students were absent from the Mother Teresa School in Walkerton; the next day, twenty-five were, with a further four sent home from Mother Teresa and eight sent home from the Walkerton Public School. The increasing number of community illnesses became even more noticeable on May 19, when a pediatrician and a retirement home both reported outbreaks of gastroenteritis among their charges. By May 20, the Walkerton hospital had fielded calls from more than a hundred people about incidents of gastroenteritis in the town, and attended to dozens more in their Emergency Department. Attending physicians and health care workers, aware that the gastroenteritis symptoms they were seeing were consistent with possible E. coli infection, began collecting stool samples from affected patients.

When public health officials put together common reports, they found that three area hospitals had recorded incidents of patients suffering from gastroenteritis symptoms. Walkerton's hospital recorded the highest number of such patients, with at least twenty patients visiting the emergency department with bloody diarrhea on May 20, and two more patients admitted for diarrhea-connected dehydration. Hospitals in two neighbouring towns had each seen one case of bloody diarrhea.

=== Initial public health response ===
On May 20, early laboratory testing was completed on fecal samples submitted the day before. E. coli O157 was found in at least one sample from the Owen Sound Hospital; when health officials contacted other hospitals in the Bruce-Grey system, they found that all were handling patients with gastrointestinal ailments consistent with E. coli infection. Potential E. coli infection changed the treatment plan for patients reporting to these hospitals or to local doctors; anti-motility medication that would typically be prescribed to patients suffering from diarrhea unrelated to E. coli could in fact exacerbate the condition of patients whose diarrhea was due to E. coli infection, and any patient infected with E. coli O157 was at risk for potentially fatal hemolytic-uremic syndrome.

David Patterson, the Assistant Director of Health Protection at Bruce-Grey-Owen-Sound Health Unit (BGOSHU), immediately contacted Beverly Middleton, a public health inspector in the Owen Sound office of the Health Unit, and the two officials began passing along information to local medical facilities about how to properly treat E. coli-based gastroenteritis. Later the same day, Patterson asked James Schmidt, Middleton's counterpart in the Walkerton Health Unit, to contact the Walkerton Public Utilities Commission (PUC) and obtain information on chlorination levels in the water system. Stan Koebel (PUC manager) informed Schmidt that chlorine residuals in the distribution system were 0.1 to 0.4 parts per million; based on lack of familiarity with water chlorination, Patterson concluded that the presence of chlorine residuals at any level indicated that the water system was free of contamination. He proceeded with investigating other possible sources for the E. coli. Throughout May 20, Patterson expressed his understanding to community members and other investigators that Walkerton's water could not be the source of the outbreak; BGOSHU personnel also urged the PUC to issue a press release assuring the public of the safety of the water.

=== Initial Public Utilities Commission response ===
By May 18, rumours were already circulating that Walkerton Public Utilities Commission (PUC) water was the cause of the illness increasing numbers of residents were suffering. Staff at the PUC had also begun receiving calls enquiring as to the safety of town water. On May 19, public health officials contacted the Walkerton PUC about the possibility of the water system being involved in transmission of the gastroenteritis; they were told that the town's drinking water was "okay". After speaking to public health officials that day, manager Stan Koebel began the process of flushing the system and increasing chlorination levels, procedures he described to David Patterson as "precautionary". This flushing continued into May 20; Koebel's testing records from that day note sharply increased chlorine residual levels, though evidence later indicated that Koebel's testing had likely been done improperly and thus returned higher-than-reality chlorination results. The same day, Koebel returned Well 5, which had not been feeding Walkerton's water supply since May 15, to service. The well was then turned off at 1:15 a.m. on May 21.

Chief Justice of Ontario Dennis O'Connor's later report on the event concluded that by May 19, Koebel was aware that the May 15 testing of water in the Walkerton system had returned results that indicated contamination, and his action to flush the system with heavily chlorinated water from Well 7 on May 19 was taken in the hopes of eradicating the contamination before further tests could be conducted. Significantly, Koebel did not disclose to the health inspectors to whom he spoke on May 19 or May 20 any information about known adverse test results or the fact that he knew Well 7 had been providing nonchlorinated water to the system from May 15 to May 19. O'Connor's report interpreted this not as an act of accidental omission, but as a deliberate attempt by Koebel to conceal what he knew to be substandard and potentially unsafe practices in his department. At the same time, however, Koebel continued to consume PUC-served water and allow his family to do the same with no apparent concern about its safety; O'Connor concluded that while Koebel knew the system was contaminated, he did not understand that the E. coli bacteria causing the contamination were potentially deadly.

Christopher Johnston: I just want to inquire and find out what's going on, that's all.

Stan Koebel: We had a fair bit of construction and there is some concern – I'm not sure, we're not finding anything ... but I am doing this [flushing and chlorinating] as a precaution ...

Christopher Johnston: So you haven't had any adverse samples then?

Stan Koebel: We've had the odd one, you know, we're in the process of changing companies, because the other company, it closed the doors, so we are going through some pains right now to get it going.

— Excerpt from May 20th telephone conversation between Stan Koebel, of the Walkerton Public Utilities Commission, and Christopher Johnston, of the Ministry of the Environment.

On May 20, Robert McKay, a PUC employee who was on medical leave at the time, anonymously contacted the Ministry of the Environment's Spills Action Centre (SAC) to report potential issues with the Walkerton water supply; after observing fire hydrants being used for system flushing, he had concluded that the flushing may have been related to the ongoing illness outbreak in the community and felt that he needed to report his conclusion. McKay also reported to the SAC that Walkerton water had failed "lab tests", but he was unable to provide detail about what aspect of the water quality had caused the failure. Later in the day on May 20, McKay attempted to contact the Ministry of Health directly about his suspicions, but was unable to get in contact with anyone empowered to handle issues in Walkerton; hoping to speed up government response time, he phoned the SAC again to report his knowledge that the Walkerton PUC was using an "unlicensed operator".

SAC employees, in response to this information, contacted the Walkerton PUC the same day for information on possible adverse water testing results. Stan Koebel acknowledged to the Ministry of the Environment (MOE) that "we've had the odd [adverse sample]" due to previous construction work but that the system flushing was occurring only as "a precaution". The MOE employee who spoke to Koebel believed that this meant any adverse samples of Walkerton water were in the past, and filed his subsequent report of the conversation accordingly; Koebel had again failed to note that he was aware of current test results that showed evidence of E. coli and fecal coliforms.

== Controlling the outbreak ==
=== Events of May 21 ===
Morning news reports on public radio on May 21 carried a statement by Dr. Murray McQuigge, Walkerton's Medical Officer of Health, reflecting medical investigators' then-current understanding that Walkerton's water system was presumed to be secure and not involved in the outbreak. McQuigge's quoted opinion also characterized E. coli as "unlikely" to be the source of the gastroenteritis outbreak.

By 12 p.m. on May 21, however, laboratory results had confirmed enough cases of E. coli O157 in area gastroenteritis patients to merit a declaration by the Bruce-Grey-Owen-Sound Health Unit (BGOSHU) that an infective outbreak existed and was being caused by E. coli O157 contamination somewhere. The Health Unit issued an outbreak number and alerted neighbouring health units of its situation, as well as notifying a variety of Walkerton-centred government and management bodies, including the Walkerton Public Utilities Commission (PUC).

Shortly after the definitive laboratory results were received, McQuigge, representing BGOSHU, contacted David Thompson, the mayor of Brockton, Walkerton's parent municipality. According to McQuigge, the conversation involved McQuigge alerting Thompson to the fact that community members were falling ill with potentially fatal E. coli infections; according to Thompson, E. coli was not mentioned in the conversation and he was left with the impression that the illnesses presented no imminent threat to public health. Despite their conflicting memories of the conversation, both McQuigge's and Thompson's later testimonies agreed that there had been no request issued that the mayor take action in response to the illnesses; Brockton's emergency plan was not put into action, and Thompson did not contact any public agencies to seek either information or action.

Given that the outbreak was continuing and that no reliable information was yet available about the source of the contamination, the BGOSHU issued a cautionary Boil Water Advisory (BWA) to the community, to be distributed via local radio stations only. Local television stations were not contacted about the advisory, nor was national CBC Radio; no paper version of the advisory was distributed to the community that day. Local radio station CKNX-FM, under the impression that the BWA was cautionary only, reported the advisory at roughly hourly intervals, beginning at 1:30 p.m., rather than more rapidly as they later stated they might have if the import of the announcement had been made clear to them at the time. As a result of the limited distribution of information regarding the BWA, much of the community remained unaware of the Boil Water Advisory until days after its May 21 issuance.

Around the time the BWA was first being broadcast, David Patterson (the Assistant Director of Health Protection at BGOSHU) contacted the MOE's Spills Action Centre (SAC) to officially report an E. coli outbreak in Walkerton. Paul Webb, the SAC employee taking Patterson's phone call, mentioned that they had previously been contacted by an anonymous source (Robert McKay) about the quality of water coming out of the Walkerton PUC. The men discussed the PUC's assurances that their water was safe, and the call ended with no action. Shortly afterward, however, Patterson contacted Stan Koebel, the manager at the Walkerton PUC again. Koebel expressed dismay at the Boil Water Advisory and the fact that the PUC had not been notified of it beforehand. He asked Patterson's advice for the best next steps to take; Patterson suggested increasing chlorination levels in the system.

The same afternoon, the Spills Action Centre contacted Stan Koebel (the PUC manager) directly to discuss the ongoing events; Koebel once again failed to mention prior known adverse testing results. In later testimony, he acknowledged that this had been a deliberate omission; the O'Connor report concluded that Koebel had been hoping that when new samples were collected on May 23, they would test clean and lift the burden from his shoulders. Stan and Frank Koebel again spent part of their day on May 21 flushing the system.

At 2:30 p.m. on May 21, the BGOSHU convened a strategic response team to handle the outbreak. After discussion, the team decided to directly notify at-risk or involved institutions, including hospitals, of the Boil Water Advisory. The Walkerton hospital received its notification at 3:30 p.m. that day. Prior to this, and despite numerous contacts with BGOSHU staff, hospital personnel had not been aware of potential danger from Walkerton water; in some cases hospital personnel had been told specifically that water was not the cause of the outbreak.

The Ministry of the Environment nominally received notification of the outbreak from a message left on the home answering machine of employee Philip Bye. Bye, however, did not recognize the significance of E. coli being present in Walkerton water and, believing the measures public health officials had already taken to be sufficient to deal with the contamination, he did not pass the news on to the emergency response arm of the MOE that day.

In the face of rising community casualties—by the evening of May 21, 270 people had contacted the Walkerton hospital after experiencing gastroenteritis symptoms, and one patient had had to be airlifted to London, Ontario, for treatment—the situation was being perceived as increasingly serious by most of those involved. That evening, the BGOSHU contacted the Minister of Health and the Chief Medical Officer of Health of Ontario. Requests were placed with the Ministry of Health for an epidemiologist and for staff to assist in treating Walkerton-region gastroenteritis patients; public health staff began looking into acquiring equipment that would be needed to treat any E. coli patients whose infections progressed to Hemolytic-Uremic Syndrome (HUS).

David Patterson ordered further testing of Walkerton's water, sending James Schmidt to collect samples of water from various sources in Walkerton, including "food premises, hospitals, and the health unit office". Patterson received Schmidt's collected samples and drove them to London overnight. The samples were received by the London Regional Public Health Laboratory at 12:45 a.m. on May 22; a further round of sampling was ordered to be done the next day.

=== Events of May 22 ===
Despite increased awareness of the severity of the outbreak, as May 22 began, some links in the public safety chain were still uninformed as to either the existence of the outbreak or the fact that it presented a real and present danger to public health. Mayor David Thompson, himself suffering from symptoms of gastroenteritis, which he assumed to be flu, took no investigatory or emergency-preparedness action on May 22, nor did James Kieffer, chair of the Walkerton Public Utilities Commission (PUC), who had been alerted to the outbreak the day before. Ministry of the Environment (MOE) employee Philip Bye, who had been notified by Bruce-Grey-Owen-Sound Health Unit (BGOSHU) phone call the previous evening, did not understand that E. coli contamination was a life-threatening emergency; he took no action until he was contacted again later on May 22 by a concerned Dr. McQuigge. At that point, Bye sent an environmental officer to join the investigation in Walkerton.

The MOE environmental officer dispatched by Bye, John Earl, spoke first to David Patterson (the Assistant Director of Health Protection at BGOSHU), who expressed his growing suspicion that Walkerton PUC water was the source of the contamination; Patterson asked Earl to obtain further information and records from Stan Koebel, the PUC manager. Koebel, in his verbal interview with Earl, failed again to provide information about adverse water testing results and other potentially crucial system information; he informed Earl that Well 7 has had a new chlorinator installed, for example, but omitted mention that this had been after the well had pumped unchlorinated water into the system for days. Earl requested and was given documentation regarding well testing, water distribution maps, and pumping history for the wells. Included in this documentation were records of the May 17 adverse testing results of May 15 samples from the "Highway 9" water main construction; excluded was pumping history for Well 7. Earl returned to the MOE with these documents and reviewed them, noting the May 17 testing results, but notified no one else of these results.

After Earl left the PUC, Stan Koebel contacted his brother Frank to ask him to "clean up" the pumping log for Well 7. Stan Koebel hoped to have a new document to present to Earl the next day that would not reflect that Well 7 had been unattended to and unchlorinated. Frank Koebel complied with this request. He destroyed the previous version of the document and created a new one with fictitious data: the new document showed Well 7 as not having operated on the days it had actually been pumping unchlorinated water into the system, and contained chlorine residual records for Well 7 which were entirely fictitious. Frank Koebel later testified that he had falsified this document "so it would look better to the MOE".

While the Ministry of the Environment investigated the outbreak from the procedural end, public health officials swung into a medical investigation. Early epidemiological investigation had demonstrated fairly strongly that infection risk seemed to correlate to physical presence in Walkerton—even for patients visiting other area hospitals, investigators typically found that the patient lived in or had visited Walkerton during the period of their infection— and investigators now began making telephone calls to patients, gathering information about onset of symptoms, possible methods of exposure, and the patients' personal demographic information.

A compilation of data from this secondary investigation demonstrated that most patients had an onset of symptoms within a fairly narrow window of time, with the highest rate of onset occurring on May 17. Taking into account the incubation period of E. coli infection, the medical team determined that most patients had been exposed to the pathogen between May 12 and May 14. Investigators had less luck trying to pinpoint a physical source of the infection; when affected patients' residences were mapped, their distribution across a map of Walkerton showed no immediately apparent pattern, with affected populations present in all areas served by Walkerton's water system.

By that evening, public health investigators had concluded based on patient interviews and demographic mapping that the water system was the most likely vehicle of infection, despite their not being aware of the corroborating documents that John Earl had collected. They began notifying branch offices of the BGOSHU of the outbreak and its cause.

=== Events of May 23 and 24 ===
The Bruce-Grey-Owen-Sound Health Unit (BGOSHU)'s May 22 presumptive conclusion about Walkerton's water was confirmed at 8:45 the following morning, when the London Regional Public Health Laboratory reported testing results on the water Schmidt had collected on May 21 and 22: both E. coli and fecal coliform results had come back positive on the May 21 samples, and though testing was not complete on the May 22 samples, evidence of coliform growth was already apparent.

John Earl (the Ministry of the Environment (MOE) environmental officer) returned to the Walkerton Public Utilities Commission (PUC) that morning to continue his investigation. Stan Koebel, the PUC manager, gave him the Well 7-related documents that he and Frank Koebel, the PUC foreman, had falsified, and Earl began to analyse the documentation he had collected over the past few days. He noted apparent irregularities in the pumping histories of all three wells, as well as unlikely chlorination levels recorded for Well 5. He communicated these irregularities to the MOE's Philip Bye, but neither man reported them outside of his own organization.

At 9:45 on the morning of May 23, David Patterson (the Assistant Director of Health Protection at BGOSHU) contacted Stan Koebel at the Walkerton PUC and informed him of the May 21 test results. Koebel, realizing that his attempts to clean the system beginning May 19 had not been sufficient, confessed to Patterson that he had been aware of the contamination of Walkerton water since May 17. Koebel was reportedly "distraught" at this point in the conversation. After ending his call with Koebel, Patterson immediately passed on the information about the May 15 test results to the chairman of the Board of Health and to Dr. Murray McQuigge, the local Medical Officer of Health.

Shortly after 11 a.m., a press conference was held at the Walkerton hospital. Led by McQuigge and attended by hospital staff, BGOSHU staff, and the media, this press conference was the first reliable report to the public of the existence and causes of an E. coli outbreak in the community.

The Walkerton hospital hosted a roundtable at 1 p.m. the same day to inform local physicians of proper treatment for E. coli O157:H7-associated gastroenteritis, especially with regard to infected children, who were at increased risk for renal failure due to Hemolytic-Uremic Syndrome. Shortly thereafter, BGOSHU staff met with the Brockton city council in the council's chambers. This meeting was attended by representatives from the Ministry of the Environment and the Public Utilities Commission as well as of BGOSHU and the city council. The attendees of the meeting reviewed what was known thus far about the timeline of the outbreak, discussed what steps could be taken going forward, and attempted to analyse the adequacy of their response to the crisis thus far. MOE representative Philip Bye announced that the MOE would be investigating the ways in which Walkerton's water system could have become the cause of the outbreak. McQuigge, in response to questions, asserted that he did not believe the public could have been notified with a Boil Water Advisory any earlier than they were; prior to May 21, neither the distribution of hospital admissions nor then-current testing results supported publicly declaring a problem in Walkerton.

The meeting became heated, with McQuigge urging Stan Koebel to "come clean", Koebel refusing to disclose adverse test results, and McQuigge and Mayor Thompson exchanging confrontational words as the meeting broke up. McQuigge later claimed that he had urged Thompson to "tell the public what you know"; Thompson alleged that McQuigge had threatened him if he "bl[e]w the whistle on me or Brockton".

Later in the afternoon, Thompson and the council convened a private meeting without BGOSHU staff to decide their next steps. Stan Koebel told meeting participants that testing had shown bacteriological issues in Wells 5 and 7; explaining, Well 7's chlorinator had not been functioning properly, he did not disclose that Well 7 had in fact been operating without any chlorinator at all. With the input of Koebel and Steve Burns, an engineer with the Highway 9 project's consulting firm, it was decided that Burns's firm would develop an action plan to remediate the water contamination. On the basis of this remediation plan, meeting participants decided that it would not be necessary to declare a state of emergency in Walkerton.

Despite this declaration, publicizing of the epidemic, and the Boil Water Advisory, local hospitals continued to treat gastroenteritis patients during the last week of May at numbers more than double typical ER throughput. Hospital staff were forced to take emergency measures, with elective and deferrable treatments redirected to other hospitals and out-of-town medical staff being pressed into service. By May 24, there had been four patient deaths and the Walkerton hospital and the BGOSHU were playing host to three epidemiologists from various arms of Health Canada. 27 people had developed HUS, a serious and potentially deadly complication of E. coli infection. The full death toll for the outbreak was initially reported as seven, but later revised to six.

== Aftermath ==
While the community attempted to recover from the events of May 2000, anger and blame ran high. On May 25, Dr. McQuigge had made a public statement saying that in his opinion, dissemination of information to the community had been hampered by lack of disclosure of adverse Walkerton Public Utilities Commission (PUC) testing results, and patient deaths could have been prevented had disclosure been made earlier; (Note: McQuigge later retracted this statement, feeling that while the number of infections may have been reduced by earlier disclosure, the death toll was not likely to have been.) by May 29, a $1 billion class-action lawsuit had been filed by community members similarly alleging that local officials had failed in their duty to notify the community.

Authorities from the Ontario Clean Water Agency took over operations at the Walkerton Public Utilities Commission on May 25 at the request of Mayor Thomson. The next day, the Ontario Provincial Police launched an investigation into the causes of the outbreak, followed within days by a coroner's inquest and an environmental investigation.

During the outbreak, both Stan and Frank Koebel denied any wrongdoing and firmly held that the water at Walkerton was safe to drink. However, as the outbreak grew in severity the two were eventually part of the criminal investigation into the incident, and, as a result, both would eventually plead guilty to a charge of common nuisance through a plea bargain. In their plea, they admitted to falsifying reports and Frank admitted to drinking alcohol on the job, as a beer fridge did exist at the facility.

Stan and Frank Koebel were both formally sentenced on December 20, 2004; Stan to one year in jail, and Frank to nine months house arrest.

The Ontario Clean Water Agency was put in charge of the cleanup of Walkerton's water system after the outbreak. The incident led to a broader environmental consciousness in Ontario, which has been linked to the change in Ontario electricity policy to phase out coal.

An inquiry, known as the Walkerton Commission led by Court of Appeal for Ontario Associate Chief Justice Dennis O'Connor, wrote a two-part report in 2002.

Part 1 was released in January 2002. The Walkerton Report, Part One, described events in the community and a series of failures, both human and systemic, that led to contamination of the water supply. The report made recommendations based on the circumstances of the outbreak. It estimated that the Walkerton water contamination cost a minimum of C$64.5–155 million and laid much of the blame at the door of the Walkerton Public Utilities Commission:

The Walkerton Public Utilities Commission operators engaged in a host of improper operating practices, including failing to use adequate doses of chlorine, failing to monitor chlorine residuals daily, making false entries about residuals in daily operating records, and misstating the locations at which microbiological samples were taken. The operators knew that these practices were unacceptable and contrary to Ministry of Environment guidelines and directives.

The Ontario government of Mike Harris was also blamed for not regulating water quality and not enforcing the guidelines that had been in place. The water testing had been privatized in October 1996.

Part 2 of the report made many recommendations for improving the quality of water and public health in Ontario. Part Two discussed water safety across the province and the steps needed to prevent similar tragedies. It made ninety-three recommendations. All of its recommendations have been accepted by succeeding governments of the province. The recommendations have also influenced provincial policies across Canada.

Key recommendations touched on source water protection as part of a comprehensive multi-barrier approach, the training and certification of operators, a quality management system for water suppliers, and more competent enforcement. In Ontario, these requirements have been incorporated into new legislation.

=== Contributing causes ===
Physical

- Well 5: shallow depth of the well, its being surrounded by fractured bedrock, and its physical location near a source of cattle manure runoff all contributed to Well 5 being unusually susceptible to contamination

Chemical

- Inadequate chlorination of Well 5's water (as well as water throughout the Walkerton PUC system) meant that, once it was contaminated by bacteria such as E. coli, it remained so.

Organizational negligence

- Public Utility Commission staff:

- Inadequate training and continuing education among staff of the Walkerton PUC meant that those responsible for the safety of the area's water were not equipped to make informed decisions in this area
- The Walkerton PUC had a long-term history of failing to abide by the minimum water testing and treatment requirements
  - Inadequate monitoring of system water: PUC staff regularly collected fewer samples than required, and collected them from improper areas of the system. Both of these practices were known to potentially lead to false-negative contamination results. Similarly, PUC staff generally failed to perform chlorine residual monitoring tests as often as necessary, and often performed them improperly when they did perform them.
  - Improper chlorination: Though the Ministry of the Environment had repeatedly reminded the PUC of the importance of maintaining the system at a 0.5 mg/L chlorine residual after 15 minutes, PUC staff relied on their personal judgment that this standard was unnecessary due to the water's inherent quality and chose to chlorinate the system to a lesser level, partially in response to community complaints that the system's water tasted of chlorine.

- Public Utility Commissioners (two elected, one the town's mayor serving commissioner) (Latin: ex officio):

- Public Utilities Commissioners should have been responsible for hiring and maintaining informed and capable PUC staff, beginning with senior management; this was neglected in Walkerton, as the commissioners felt that their responsibilities encompassed only "budgeting and financial aspects of the operation".
- Commissioners relied on PUC manager Stan Koebel to make policy and inform the Commission of water quality-related events of interest, even when commissioners were or should have been aware of such information and responsible for policy-setting. Commissioners also failed to review whether Koebel was performing these aspects of his job adequately.
- Commissioners were offered no education on the topic of water safety, and none was required of them in order to be elected or to serve. Commissioners typically did not consider this knowledge a requirement for doing their jobs, even when they had access to relevant resources.

Negligence by individuals

- Falsification of reports: PUC staff regularly entered chlorine residual results on log sheets that did not reflect actual testing results or that represented testing that had never been performed at all.
- Stan Koebel, general manager of the Walkerton PUC:
  - Koebel knowingly failed to notify the Bruce-Grey-Owen-Sound Health Unit when he became aware on May 15 that water from his system was heavily contaminated.
  - Prior to public health investigators determining that the water system was a likely cause of the outbreak, Koebel communicated to the Health Unit the false impression that the water system had been checked and was safe.

== In media ==
The lessons learned from this incident were described by Kim Vicente in his book The Human Factor.

A 2002 episode of Diagnosis Unknown: In The Heart of Human Crisis, Season 1 Episode 6 titled "Unlikely Source" chronicled the outbreak and interviewed many of the physicians and public health officials involved in the source control and management of this outbreak, along with archival footage.

A 2005 CBC Television docudrama called Betrayed was based loosely upon the Walkerton E. coli outbreak.

On May 11, 2018, the Toronto Star reported that following 18 years of suffering Robbie Schnurr had doctors assist him in ending his life due to illness caused by the outbreak. They also reported that twenty-two of the children who became sick in 2000 acquired permanent kidney damage.

== Sources ==
- "The investigative report of the Walkerton outbreak of waterborne gastroenteritis" (PDF). Bruce-Grey-Owen-Sound Health Unit. October 10, 2000. Archived from the original (PDF) on July 5, 2017.
- O'Connor, Dennis R. (January 18, 2002a). "Part I: A Summary". Report of the Walkerton Inquiry: The Events of May 2000 and Related Issues. Ontario Ministry of the Attorney General.
- O'Connor, Dennis R. (May 23, 2002b). "Part II: A Strategy for Safe Drinking Water". Report of the Walkerton Inquiry: The Events of May 2000 and Related Issues. Ontario Ministry of the Attorney General.
