= Colin J. Gillespie =

Australian writer (born 1941)

- Born: 11 May 1941 (age 84); Adelaide, South Australia
- Education: BSc 1961, Melbourne University PhD 1967, Monash University JD 1980, University of Manitoba
- Occupations: Physicist, lawyer, strategist and writer.

Colin J. Gillespie (born 11 May 1941) is a writer, physicist, lawyer and strategic analyst. He has written several books and traveled in more than fifty countries on all seven continents.

== Early life and education ==
Gillespie was born in Adelaide, South Australia, and raised in Evenley near Brackley in England and in Melbourne, Australia. He attended Melbourne Grammar School.

He had an eclectic education, studying nuclear physics, mathematics and theory of statistics at Melbourne University and quantum mechanics at Monash University, doing post-doctoral work in biophysics with the National Research Council of Canada (1967–1969), and research in neurophysiology and radiation biology with Atomic Energy of Canada Limited (1970–1975). In 1980 he graduated with a JD from University of Manitoba. He was admitted to the Bars of Manitoba and Saskatchewan. He practiced environmental, aboriginal (and especially indigenous) and constitutional law and was managing partner of a major law firm.

== Career ==
He pursued a special interest in Aboriginal child protection at Weechi-it-te-win Family Services. Much of his work as a lawyer was for aboriginal clients, often pro bono. He was counsel to multi-national corporations on environmental licensing. He was a consultant to aboriginal tribes on implications of hydro-electric development, and to the Alberta Cancer Hospitals Board and the Alberta Premier's Advisory Committee on Advanced Medical Technology. At the Cross Cancer Institute he developed a program for actuarial analysis of cancer survival with Adalei Starreveld and co-wrote with Donald Chapman a text on radiation-induced events in mammalian cells. Latterly, they co-wrote an editorial on bringing cancer treatment up to date.

He was strategic counsel to a company that was building the world's first commercial spaceport at the site of the former Churchill Rocket Research Range and was involved in negotiating the purchase of surplus SS-25 intercontinental ballistic missiles from STC Complex in Russia.

He learned from tribal elders of the constitutions of two indigenous peoples, the Pimicikamak and the Anishinabe Nation in Treaty No. 3, and their respective governments and helped bring these up to date. He worked on several cases in the Supreme Court of Canada, including the case on whether the Government of Canada could unilaterally patriate the constitution of Canada from the United Kingdom and the case concerning the validity of laws in Manitoba that were made in English and not French.

He has written on the struggle of an indigenous people, the origin of the universe, and the discovery of the space quantum.

=== Scientific career ===
- Research Fellow, National Research Council of Canada (1967–1969)
- Research Officer, Atomic Energy of Canada Limited (1970–1976)
- Consultant on implications of hydro-electric development (1975–1977)
- Consultant to Alberta Cancer Hospitals Board & Alberta Government Committee on Advanced Medical Technology (1977–1978)
- Co-authored an editorial on "The Power of Biophysics" in the International Journal of Radiation Oncology, Biology and Physics

=== Legal career ===
- Associate, Taylor Brazzell McCaffrey (1981–1982) Partner, Taylor McCaffrey (1983–2007), managing partner (1988–1989), senior counsel (2007–2010)
- Adjunct Professor, University of Manitoba, Faculty of Graduate Studies] (2000–2007)

==== Leading cases ====
- The unilateral patriation case (Man. C.A. and S.C.C.)
- The Bilodeau case (s. 27 of the Manitoba Act) (Man. C.A. and S.C.C.)
- The Air Canada et al. sales tax case (S.C.C.)
- Westco Storage Ltd. v. Inter-City Gas Utilities Ltd. (C.A.; S.C.C. leave denied)
- Old St. Boniface Residents Association v. City of Winnipeg (C.A.; S.C.C.)

== Past & present memberships ==
- American Association for the Advancement of Science
- Biophysical Society
- Canadian Institute for Administration of Justice
- Canadian Bar Association
- Selden Society
- Society of Professionals in Dispute Resolution

=== Past offices ===
- vice-president Canadian Mental Health Association Winnipeg Region
- chairperson Strategic Planning Committee, chairperson Housing Appeal Board
- member-at-large Manitoba Advisory Committee on Sustainable Development Implementation
- director & president Social Planning Council of Winnipeg
- director Canadian Council on Children and Youth
- campaign chairperson of YM/YWCA International Development Committee

== Awards ==
- Commonwealth Scholarship (1959)
- Monash Post-Graduate Scholarship (1961–1967)
- National Research Council Post-Doctoral Fellowship (1967–1970)
- William Rachman Prize for Legal Research & Writing (1979)
- University of Manitoba Alumni Association Scholarship (1979)
- Cathy Turner Prize in Evidence (1980)
- Alf Francis Memorial Prize (1980)
- Hon. Mr. Justice Hudson Prize in Jurisprudence (1981)
- Law Society of Manitoba Prize (1981)

== Selected publications ==
- Gillespie, C.J. (1966). "Electron Tunneling between Superconducting Thin Films". In Tomlin, S.G. (ed.). The Physics of Thin Films. University of Adelaide Press. p. 121.
- Gillespie, C.J. (1970). "Ion sorption and the potential profile near a model lecithin membrane". Biochimica et Biophysica Acta (BBA) - Biomembranes. 203 (1): 47–61. doi:10.1016/0005-2736(70)90034-9. PMID 5445679.
- Chapman, J.D.; Gillespie, C.J. (1981). "Radiation-Induced Events and Their Time Scale in Mammalian Cells". In Lett, J.T. (ed.). Advances in Radiation Biology. New York: Academic Press. pp. 9, 143.
- Gillespie, C.J. (1990). "Enforceable Rights from Administrative Guidelines?". Canadian Journal of Administrative Law and Practice. 3: 204.
- Gillespie, Colin (2004). The Nature and Legal Capacity of Pimicikamak and its Government. Taylor McCaffrey.
- Chapman, J. Donald; Gillespie, Colin J. (2012). "The Power of Radiation Biophysics—Let's Use It". International Journal of Radiation Oncology, Biology, Physics. 84 (2): 309–11. doi:10.1016/j.ijrobp.2012.04.020. PMID 22935394.
