= Bone Black =

Bone Black may refer to:

- Bone Black: Memories of Girlhood, an account of author bell hooks growing up, written in 1996
- Bone Black (2019 novel), a novel about vengeance
- The pigment bone char is also known as bone black
