= Rosemary Gillespie =

Australian lawyer and activist (1941–2010)

- Born: 4 February 1941
- Died: 21 June 2010; Melbourne, Australia
- Education: University of Melbourne, University of Chicago, Monash University, and Australian National University

Rosemarie or Rosemary Gillespie (4 February 1941 – 21 June 2010), also known as Waratah Rose, was an Australian lawyer, human rights activist, author and film producer. She was active in human rights causes in Australia, the US, Melanesia, the Pacific Islands and the Middle East for more than forty years.

== Life and education ==
Rosemarie Lorraine Sampford was born on 4 February 1941, in Melbourne, to parents of European descent. She married Colin Gillespie in 1963 and divorced in 1973.

She was "not content with the restrictions imposed by the socially accepted roles for women", and campaigned as a teenager for equal access to science equipment at Melbourne Girls' Grammar School. From 1968 to 1975 she lived in the United States and studied at the universities of Chicago and Colorado where she was involved in anti-Vietnam War and feminist movements, and advocating for African-American and Chicano (Hispanic) rights. She enrolled in and earned degrees at University of Melbourne, University of Chicago, Monash University, and Australian National University. She qualified as a barrister in 1989 after obtaining a law degree from Monash University. During that period she co-ordinated anti-poverty campaigns for the Poverty Action Program.

== Human rights ==
Gillespie first began campaigning for human rights causes in opposition to the White Australia policy. The policy, which ceased in 1975, restricted immigration to Australia to Europeans and other white immigrant groups and excluded Caucasians or Indo-Europeans from anywhere east of the Mediterranean apart from Turks after World War II, despite the massacre of the entire population of Smyrna and burning the city to the ground 9 September 1922, because they were ethnically Greek and Armenian.

She campaigned to end French nuclear testing at Mururoa and then much of her efforts focused on human rights in Melanesia. In 1982 she was featured in an Australian Broadcasting Corporation Four Corners program exposing Australia's involvement in Fijian politics after she had spent years infiltrating the National Civic Council. A member of Australia's parliament, Gerard Hand, raised the issue of Gillespie being asked to attend a Royal Commission inquiry into the 1982 Fijian elections and asked the Australian government to provide legal aid to her. Gillespie was briefly held as a political prisoner during the 1987 Fijian military coups d'état as she was involved in the Movement for Democracy.

She represented a Bougainvillean asylum-seeker in Australia in 1992, and found out more about Bougainville civil war. A founder of the Bougainville Freedom Movement, Gillespie campaigned against a naval blockade of the island of Bougainville by the government of Papua New Guinea during the Civil War in the 1990s. She wrote in her website, "A cry for help from behind a military blockade, as children were dying because of a lack of medicines that could save their lives, prompted me to brave the dangers and bring relief to the besieged island." She is reported as influencing the position of the Australian government and made a submission to the Human Rights Sub-Committee hearing into Australia's International Efforts to Promote and Protect Human Rights. An Australian politician, Gerard Hand, in 1993 welcomed charges against Gillespie being dropped for supplying medicine to Bougainvilleans although she was criticised for her efforts later in parliament by Don Randall in 1997. In 1998, Australia's foreign minister, Alexander Downer was asked about her role in the Bougainville civil war.

A critic of U.S. foreign policy, Gillespie travelled to Iraq as a human shield during the 2003 invasion of Iraq. She created two short documentary films about the war in Iraq: Witness to Invasion and Against Humanity. She was highly critical of capitalism, calling it "institutionalised violence".

Gillespie was vice president of the Humanist Society in Sydney and convenor and leader of the feminist Campaign for Economic Justice. She was a long-time campaigner for women's rights. In 1991 she made a submission to the House of Representatives Inquiry into Equal Opportunity and Equal Status for Australian Women.

Towards the end of her life she was involved in advocating for Aboriginal rights and joined the Canberra meeting of the Quakers in 1999 and wrote and spoke about peace, justice and Aboriginal rights.

== Writing ==
Two of Gillespie's books, Ecocide: Industrial Chemical Contamination and the Corporate Profit Imperative – The Case of Bougainville (1999) and Running with Rebels: Behind the lies in Bougainville's hidden war (2009) focused on her experiences in Bougainville. Invasion of Iraq: An Eyewitness Account (2004) focused on her experience in Iraq. She wrote a pamphlet in 2005, About Aboriginal Sovereignty.

== Death and legacy ==
Rosemarie Gillespie died at her daughter's home in Melbourne on 21 June 2010, at the age of 69. She was survived by her two daughters, three grandchildren, one sister and a brother.

In 2016 the Quakers held a smoking ceremony in her honour and dedicated a garden to her "Waratah’s Peace Garden" at Silver Wattle Quaker Centre, Bungendore. Her files relating to her time (1973–1984) working with the National Civic Council are held in the State Library of New South Wales.
