= Trouble in the Garden =

2018 Canadian film directed by Roz Owen

- Directed by: Roz Owen
- Written by: Roz Owen
- Produced by: Jennifer Mesich
- Starring: Cara Gee; Jon Cor; Fiona Reid; Frank Moore
- Cinematography: Michael Caterina
- Edited by: Michael Lane; Michelle Szemberg
- Production company: White Eagle Entertainment
- Release date: September 19, 2018 (Cinéfest)
- Running time: 80 minutes
- Country: Canada
- Language: English

Trouble in the Garden is a 2018 Canadian drama film, written and directed by Roz Owen. The film stars Cara Gee as Raven McTavish, an Indigenous Canadian woman who was raised by a white adoptive family from whom she is now estranged; after being arrested at a protest against a residential development on traditional indigenous land, she is bailed out of jail by her brother Colin (Jon Cor), a real estate developer involved in the very housing development she was protesting.

The cast also includes Fiona Reid and Frank Moore as their parents Lillian and Rob, as well as Kelly Van der Burg, Wesley French, Persephone Koty, Michaela Washburn, Caleb Marshall, Kristin Shepherd, Marcus Dias and Chris Farquhar in supporting roles.

Raven Sinclair, a prominent academic and Sixties Scoop activist, was a consultant and executive producer on the film.

The film premiered at the 2018 Cinéfest Sudbury International Film Festival, before going into commercial release in 2019.
