= Kimelman Report =

The Kimelman Report had a substantial and lasting impact on aboriginal child protection in Canada that was part of a fundamental shift in international child protection paradigms for aboriginal peoples.

In the early 1980s, following the notorious Sixties Scoop, in which many children were removed from aboriginal families for adoption by non-aboriginal parents and in some cases international adoption. The Manitoba government established a Review Committee on Indian and Métis Adoptions and Placements. Judge Edwin C. Kimelman chaired the Committee. In 1984, "After reviewing the file of every Native child who had been adopted by an out-of-province family in 1981, Judge Kimelman stated: 'having now completed the review of the files... the Chairman now states unequivocally that cultural genocide has been taking place in a systematic, routine manner'."

In 1985, the Review Committee issued a final report, entitled "No Quiet Place" and known in child welfare circles as the Kimelman Report, that had profound impact on aboriginal child protection in Canada and perhaps elsewhere. The report had 109 recommendations that address issues in the existing Child Welfare system in Manitoba. The following excerpts are from the report:

The chairman was determined that the structure of the committee not stand in the way of the production of a meaningful report dealing with substantive issues which could and would be implemented. The need to avoid the possibility of the committee being used merely to silence the hue and cry raised by the native organizations was clear. This study is not to be a whitewash of the child welfare system

In 1982, no one, except the Indian and the Metis people, really believed the reality- that native children were routinely being shipped to adoption homes in the United States and other provinces in Canada. Every social worker, every administrator, and every agency of region viewed the situation from a narrow perspective and saw each individual case as an exception, as a case involving extenuating circumstances. No one fully comprehend that 25% of all children placed for adoption were placed outside of Manitoba. No one fully comprehend that virtually all those children were of native descent.

== See also ==
- Richard Cardinal: Cry from a Diary of a Métis Child
