= Foster Child =

Foster Child may refer to:

- Foster child
- Foster Child (1987 film), a documentary film by Gil Cardinal
- Foster Child (2007 film), a Filipino indie pregnancy drama film
