= Richard Cardinal: Cry from a Diary of a Métis Child =

1986 documentary film directed by Alanis Obomsawin

Richard Cardinal: Cry from a Diary of a Métis Child is a 1986 National Film Board of Canada documentary film by Alanis Obomsawin, about the suicide of Métis youth Richard Stanley Cardinal, who killed himself in 1984 at the age of 17. Cardinal, who had been placed in 28 different homes during his 14 years in Alberta's child welfare system, hanged himself from a cross bar he had nailed between two trees near his last foster home, northwest of Edmonton.

== Content ==
The film makes use of Cardinal's remembrances from his diary, and helped to change public perceptions in Canada around the treatment of children in the foster care system.

Cardinal was born in Fort Chipewyan. Because of alcoholism in his family, the children were separated from their parents. The Royal Canadian Mounted Police moved the children to Fort McMurray where they were given different foster parents, with Richard and his older brother Charlie housed together for the first while—where a litany of physical and mental abuse began.

Obomsawin offers Cardinal's life story as an expression of the plight of "15,000 native children [who] are wards of the provinces." Cardinal recollections of abuse at his first foster home placement at age six, when he and his older brother were whipped with their pants down in front of the three daughters of his foster family. It quotes Cardinal's brother as stating, "What Richard needed most was to go home. His funeral was the best social service that was provided for Richard, because it finally brought his family together."

She also made the film for other children: "I want people who look at the film to have a different attitude next time they meet what is called a 'problem child', and develop some love and some relationship to the child -- instead of alienating him."

== Inquiries ==
His death sparked a provincial government inquiry, which offered 22 recommendations for improving how courts, the provincial government, schools, hospitals, aboriginal organizations and media deal with foster children—including recommendations that have been repeated at subsequent inquiries following Aboriginal youth deaths. However, a January 2014 article in the Calgary Herald reported that such recommendations, which are neither binding on the government nor tracked for implementation, have largely been ignored.

== Retrospectives ==
In recent years, Richard Cardinal: Cry from a Diary of a Métis Child has been featured in retrospectives at the Museum of Modern Art (2008), Hot Docs Canadian International Documentary Festival (2009), and the Berlin International Film Festival (2013).

In 2021 the film was selected for inclusion in Celebrating Alanis, a retrospective program of Obomsawin's films at the 2021 Toronto International Film Festival.

== See also ==
- Foster Child
- Sixties Scoop
- Kimelman Report
