= Raven Sinclair =

Canadian child welfare critic and professor

Raven Sinclair (Ótiskewápíwskew) is Cree/Assinniboine/Saulteaux and a member of Gordon First Nation of the Treaty#4 area of southern Saskatchewan and Dean of Social Work at University nuhelot’įne thaiyots’į nistameyimâkanak Blue Quills. She is a survivor and expert on the Sixties Scoop, the practice of taking Indigenous children from their families and placing them in foster care or adopting them out to white families. She is a critic of the current child welfare system in Canada, especially as it relates to Indigenous peoples. She is a professor, film maker, author, public speaker, and facilitator. Sinclair is also a founding editorial member of the Journal of Indigenous Voices in Social Work (University of Hawai'i at Mānoa), and past regional editor for AlterNative: An International Journal of Indigenous Peoples.

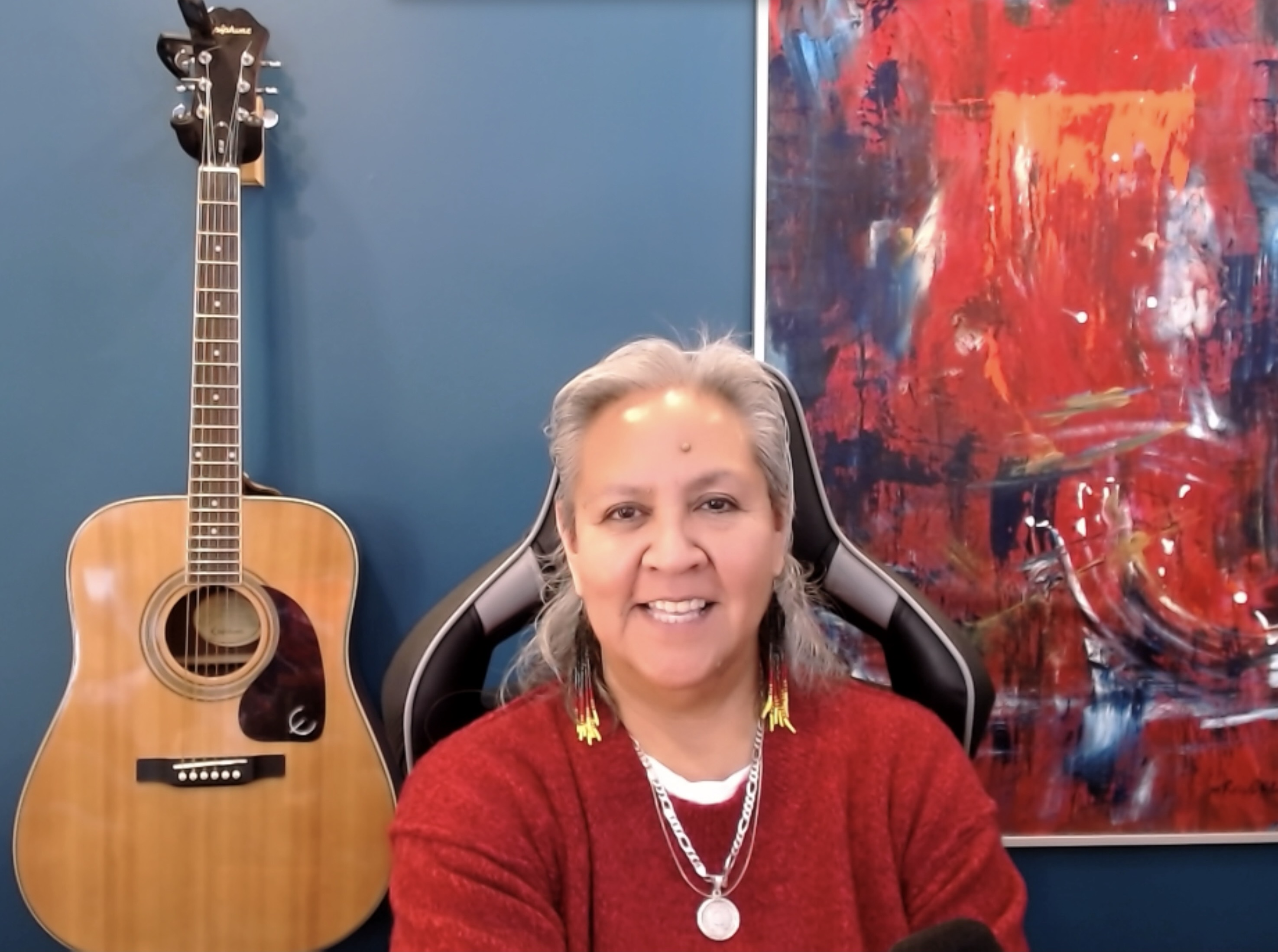

== Education ==
Sinclair began studies at the undergraduate level at the University of Toronto in 1981. She completed a BA in Psychology from the University of Saskatchewan and went on to study at First Nations University in the bachelor of Indian Social Work program. At that time it was the only post-secondary program taking an Indigenous approach. She holds a Master of Social Work from the University of Toronto and PhD from the University of Calgary.

== Career ==
Sinclair is currently the Dean of Social Work at Blue Quills University, a First Nation owned and operated University in St. Paul, Alberta. She retired as a full professor from the Faculty of Social Work at the University of Regina in 2022. She has published extensively on the "Sixties scoop," with her work being cited by publications such as The Canadian Encyclopedia, and has appeared on programs such as CBC's "The National."

Sinclair was the executive producer of the 2016 film A Truth to be Told: The 60's Scoop in the Splatsin Community. The film examines the idea of "child saving" and the impacts on Indigenous peoples and the child welfare system in Canada with a focus on the story of the Splatsin band’s (Shuswap) experience of child welfare removals in the 1960s and 70s.

She was an executive producer on the 2018 drama film Trouble in the Garden.

Raven was a writer/consultant on the award winning 2023 Crave TV Series Little Bird.

She is currently writing/consulting on a feature drama/comedy.

== Selected publications ==
- Kennedy-Kish (Bell), Banakonda; Carniol, Ben; Baines, Donna; Sinclair, Raven; Carniol, Ben (2017). Case critical: social service and social justice in Canada. ISBN 978-1-77113-311-1.
- Sinclair, Raven (2020). "Aboriginal Youth Gangs in Canada: (de)constructing an epidemic". First Peoples Child & Family Review. 7 (1): 8–28. doi:10.7202/1068862ar. ISSN 2293-6610.
- Sinclair, Raven (2009). Wicihitowin - Aboriginal social work in Canada. ISBN 978-1-55266-317-2.
- Sinclair, Raven (2020). "Identity lost and found: Lessons from the sixties scoop". First Peoples Child & Family Review. 3 (1): 65–82. doi:10.7202/1069527ar. ISSN 2293-6610.
- Pooyak, Sherri; Sinclair, Raven; Big Brothers/Big Sisters of Saskatoon; Community-University Institute for Social Research; Indigenous Peoples' Health Research Centre (2007). Aboriginal mentoring in Saskatoon: a cultural perspective. Regina, Sask.: Indigenous Peoples' Health Research Centre.
- Sinclair, Raven; Smith, Robin; Stevenson, Nicole (2006). Miyo-Māhcihowin: a report on indigenous health in Saskatchewan. Regina, Sask.: Indigenous Peoples' Health Research Centre.
- Sinclair, Raven (2020). "Aboriginal Social Work Education in Canada: Decolonizing Pedagogy for the Seventh Generation". First Peoples Child & Family Review. 1 (1): 49–62. doi:10.7202/1069584ar. ISSN 2293-6610.
- Sinclair, Raven (2003). ""Indigenous research in social work: The challenge of operationalizing worldview"". Native Social Work Journal = Nishnaabe Kinoomaadwin Naadmaadwin. ISSN 1206-5323.
- "All my relations ~ Native transracial adoption: A critical case study of cultural identity | Canadian Child Welfare Research Portal".
