= Nakuset =

Cree Indigenous activist

Na'kuset (born 1970) is a Cree advocate, living in Montreal, Quebec, Canada. Na'kuset is a survivor of the "Sixties Scoop," when Canadian government policy lead to many Indigenous children being forcibly and purposefully adopted into non-Indigenous families. Na'kuset reclaimed her Indigenous identity and status as a young adult. She earned a Bachelors of Applied Human Sciences from Concordia University in Montreal. Na'kuset has worked for the Native Friendship Centre of Montreal, and as the Executive Director for the Native Women's Shelter of Montreal. She has earned a number of recognitions and awards for her work, advocacy and activism, and has been the subject of a number of media reports and documentaries including Becoming Nakuset.

== Early life ==
Na'kuset was born in Thompson, Manitoba, Canada in 1970. Her Cree community is located in La Ronge, Saskatchewan. Na'kuset was taken from her Cree mother and siblings at age three, was put up for adoption through the AIM program (Adopt an Indian and Metis project), and was legally adopted and raised by a Jewish family in Montreal, Quebec. Her adoptive parents adopted her through Jewish Family Services out of a catalogue of First Nations Children created by the Government of Canada to place First Nations children into non-Indigenous families. Na'kuset's adoption occurred during a period in the 1970's in Canada known as the Sixties Scoop. As part of the Sixties Scoop, she was one of the 20,000 Indigenous children and youth who faced forced adoption. Na'kuset's adoptive parents changed her name and discouraged her from sharing her Indigenous roots. Na'kuset's adoptive family already had an adopted a non-indigenous son, who was nine months older than she.

Na'kuset struggled with her integrating into the Jewish community. Her grandmother whom she lovingly called "Bubbi" played a very important role in her life. In a documentary on her life created by the Canadian Broadcasting Corporation, she mentioned that her grandmother "was like the anchor, the only person that I could talk to and feel comfortable with." It was her grandmother who helped her to find her biological family (her biological mother and siblings). In her early twenties, with the help of her Bubbi, Na'kuset contacted and soon after visited her biological family. She was able to reunite with her beloved sister Sonya Murray, who had been looking for her since they were separated during the 60's Scoop. She later got her Indian status and changed her name to Na'kuset.

Na'kuset was the story advisor for the TV series Little Bird, and much of the story in that series was based on her life and experiences. She was also featured in the making of Little Bird documentary, Coming Home (Wanna Icipus Kupi).

Na'kuset is a mother of three boys.

== Education ==
After getting her Indian Status, Na'kuset enrolled in Concordia University and graduated with a Bachelors of Applied Human Science (BAsc) with a degree in Human Relations.

== Career ==
Na'kuset began her career as a summer student in the position of volunteer coordinator with the Native Friendship Centre of Montreal.[1]

She joined the Native Women's Shelter of Montreal in 1999, an Indigenous organization that provides support, shelter, and empowerment exclusively to Indigenous women and their children. Her initial role was as a front line worker and after years of service, she became the Executive Director of the Native Women's Shelter of Montreal in 2004.

One of the projects Na'kuset spear-headed early in her career was a cultural manual for non-Indigenous families who adopted or fostered Indigenous children, to help strengthening cross cultural foster care and adoptions.

Na'kuset created, wrote, and produced Indigenous Power in partnership with Bell Local (Fibe TV1) in 2014. The objective of this multi-episode community television series is to portray Indigenous people in a positive light by highlighting our strengths and leadership within the community as artists, musicians, scholars, professionals and to profile our projects. Episodes are available to watch on YouTube.

In 2015, Na'kuset was the Indigenous columnist for the television show CityLife on Videotron's MAtv.

She is also the co-founder and Director of Development of Resilience Montreal created in 2019 to support the Indigenous homeless people in the Cabot Square area of Montreal.

When Raphael Andre passed away during Covid due to the fact that he couldn't access a warm space, Na'kuset spearheaded the Raphael Andre memorial Tent and the NWSM ran it for 18 months.

== Marches and Vigils ==
She organized the first Every Child Matters march since July 1, 2021

== Permanent People's Tribunal on Disappeared Indigenous Children and Unmarked Graves ==
In 2023, she had met with the general secretariat, Agnès Callamard, at Amnistie Internationale Canada francophones. In reference to the discovery of mass graves found in Kamloops and Saskatchewan, she asked her “what is the closest thing we can get to a Nuremberg trial?” ~~‌~~She encouraged Na'kuset to write to the Permanent People's Tribunal (PPT), who are based in Rome, and request an online meeting. In 2024, the Permanent People's Tribunal agreed to hold to investigate the alleged crimes committed against Indigenous children in Canada’s residential schools. NWSM is leading the urgent international call for accountability and building a lasting global record of evidence. On September 30th, 2026, the judges concluded that Canada has committed Crimes Against Humanity and Genocide against Indigenous people.

== Children's Book ==
In October 14th, 2025, Na'kuset and Judith Henderson published a children's book called "I am my Name. A Girl's Journey to Finding Her Cree Family".

== Distinctions ==
- Woman of the Year 2014, nominated by the Montreal Council of Women
- Recipient of Paul-Gérin-Lajoie Award for Diversity, 2021
- Recipient of the Women of Distinction 2022: Inspiration Award, 2022
- Appointed to the Human Rights Walkaway, and inducted into the city of Côte Saint-Luc, 2023

== See also ==
- Little Bird (TV series)
