= Weechi-it-te-win Family Services =

Weechi-it-te-win Family Services is a family services agency focused on the needs of Anishinaabe families in ten communities in the southern part of the traditional territory of the Anishinaabe Nation in Treaty #3 in Canada. It provides bicultural aboriginal and mainstream child protection and prevention services based upon cultural competence. Weechi-it-te-win "is an example of First Nations communities reclaiming jurisdiction for their children and safeguarding a cultural heritage shaken by the impacts of colonization, the legacy of the residential schools and intervention by the mainstream child welfare system." Weechi-te-win is a national child protection agency of the Anishinaabe Nation in Treaty #3. The defining difference between Weechi-it-te-win and mainstream services is its focus on customary care. Its website says: "Weechi-it-te-win was founded as an Indian Alternative and we continue to envision the revitalizing of an Anishinaabe child care system that is rooted in the customs, traditions and values of the Anishinaabe people."

== Children and cultural survival ==
Like other agencies for aboriginal child protection world-wide, Weechi-it-te-win is focused on the protecting children within a modern aboriginal and bi-cultural context. "The mission of Weechi-it-te-win is to preserve Indian (Anishinaabe) culture and identity among our people; to strengthen and maintain Indian (Anishinaabe) families and through them our communities; and to assure the growth, support and development of all children within our families and communities." This mission must be understood in the context of a history of both the systemic use of aboriginal child protection for genocidal purposes and the participation of Anishinaabe communities in mainstream society in Canada. Denying a people the right to raise its own children is a method for culturally extinguishing it.

== Anishinaabe customary law ==
Weechi-it-te-win bicultural practice is based upon both the customary law of the Anishinaabe Nation in Treaty #3 and statutory law of the province of Ontario. Customary care derives from customary laws. Customary Anishinaabe laws are mostly uncodified. Such laws are enforceable in the courts of Canada. "Abinoojii naaniigaan" expresses a foundational legal principle in Anishinaabe law: that the total well-being of a child is the central consideration in the care and protection of children. It means literally, "The child comes first and foremost," and admits neither exception nor excuse. This principle is consistent with but more forceful than the conventional child protection concept: "the best interests of the child". Even more forceful is a companion principle: "kizheowsowin", which invokes the fierce love for, and protection of, children exemplified by a mother bear who will kill or die in the protection of her cubs. Taken together, Anishinaabe customary legal principles reflect a more holistic worldview and so give relatively greater emphasis to spiritual, cultural and relational needs in addition to physical needs of the child. This emphasis seems to be a common element in aboriginal child protection principles and practice.

== Community-based services ==
Weechi-it-te-win's child protection services are community based. Each community has its own service delivery system, which is supported by Weechi-it-te-win. Customary care practices are community-specific because they are adapted to local culture and circumstances. Ontario child protection laws, developed for non-aboriginal culture and urban circumstances, are not necessarily relevant to or effective in these communities and may result in unintended injury to Anishinaabe children.

== Enforcement ==
The Anishinaabe people's maintenance of its customary law and its cultural continuity through its children are aboriginal rights. Such rights are recognized and affirmed by the Canadian Constitution. Although infrequently relied upon in the past, aboriginal laws including customary law continue to be enforceable in Canadian courts. Anishinaabe customary laws, the Canadian Constitution, and Ontario laws are enforced by the Court of Ontario.
