= Carol Rose GoldenEagle =

Canadian writer and broadcaster

- Born: 1963 (age 62–63); Saskatchewan
- Other names: Carol Morin; Carol Adams; Carol Daniels; Osawa Mikisew Iskwew
- Occupations: writer, broadcaster

Carol Rose GoldenEagle is a Canadian writer and broadcaster, from Saskatchewan.

== Early life and education ==
Carol Rose GoldenEagle was born in 1963, in a religious hospital, to a First Nations woman who was unmarried. Hospital authorities stripped her from her mother. Her adoption, without the agreement of her mother, was part of a now discredited program known as the Sixties Scoop. The purpose of the program was to break Native culture by adopting children into white families. Hospital authorities intervened to take GoldenEagle from her mother even though she was a nurse. GoldenEagle never met her mother, only being able to trace her roots as an adult, and learning her mother had died in a car accident.

GoldenEagle describes growing up without knowing anyone else of First Nations' background, hearing disparaging comments about Natives, even from some members of her adopted family, singling out her adopted father as an exception, who did support her, and didn't allow those comments in his hearing. Nevertheless, she described feeling second class as a child.

GoldenEagle began volunteering at a local radio station CKCK when she was in grade eleven, and edited her high school newspaper in grade twelve. She studied journalism at the Southern Alberta Institute of Technology (SAIT).

== Career ==
=== Journalism ===
After two years at SAIT GoldenEagle began working at radio station CKRM, before moving on to CKTV, where she was a weekend anchor.

She joined CBC Newsworld, the CBC's newly launched all news cable channel, in 1989. While there, when she hosted This Country she was the first Indigenous woman to anchor a national broadcast. She also spent 8 years as the anchor at CBC North, in Yellowknife.

=== Connecting with her First Nations heritage ===
GoldenEagle described how she first got to know other First Nations people, as a journalist. She singled out First Nations artist Allen Sapp as a mentor. When they were introduced he started speaking to her in the Cree language, assuming she too could speak it. She describes him as a wise and gentle man who encouraged her to find her heritage, learn to speak Cree, and encouraged her to paint.

She did connect with her birth family, did learn Cree, and now helps lead cultural workshops. She has worked to help re-introduce traditional First Nations drumming back to Saskatchewan - an activity the Government suppressed after the North-West Rebellion.

In 2016, GoldenEagle published an op-ed in Quill & Quire about the murder and disappearance of Native women, and the impact it had on her. She wrote first becoming aware that First Nations women were being targeted, and their murders and disappearances were not being properly investigated, after learning about the kidnapping, rape and murder of Helen Betty Osborne, from The Pas, Manitoba, whose brutal murder went practically uninvestigated for decades. She wrote about her responsibility to speak up, to protect young women, like her daughter.

In 2019, the CBC published an op-ed GoldenEagle wrote about the effect of names on the feelings of identity for First Nations people, like herself. GoldenEagle had recently gone through a traditional naming ceremony, taking the name Osawa Mikisew Iskwew, and she described what that meant, for her.

=== Writer ===
The protagonist of her first novel, Bearskin Diary, published in 2015, like GoldenEagle is a First Nations journalist trying to recover her Native roots.

GoldenEagle published a volume of poetry, entitled Hiraeth, in 2019. It was shortlisted for a Saskatchewan Book Award.

Her second novel, Bone Black, features a First Nations hero who seeks revenge against individuals who have murdered First Nations women, after her sister is murdered. According to the Regina Leader-Post GoldenEagle was so overcome by emotion when she heard about the 2014 murder of teenage First Nations girl Tina Fontaine, on her car's radio, that she had to pull over. A comment from another First Nations parent, about how the loss of their child triggered a desire for personal vengeance, was a trigger for the novel.
