= Anishinaabe Nation in Treaty No. 3 =

Anishinaabe community in Canada

The Anishinaabe Nation in Treaty No. 3 is a sovereign Anishinaabe Nation in Canada. It has existed as a self-governing people with its own laws and government institutions since time immemorial, before the arrival of European settlers. "America, separated from Europe by a wide ocean, was inhabited by ... separate nations, independent of each other and of the rest of the world, having institutions of their own, and governing themselves by their own laws." "The territory included in Treaty #3 in 1873 was governed by a Grand Council of Anishinaabe Chiefs. ... This civil leadership was responding to other political ranks and ultimately to the constituent families." The Nation is, by constitutional definition, the Anishinaabe people that entered into Treaty 3 with the Crown in 1873.

== History ==
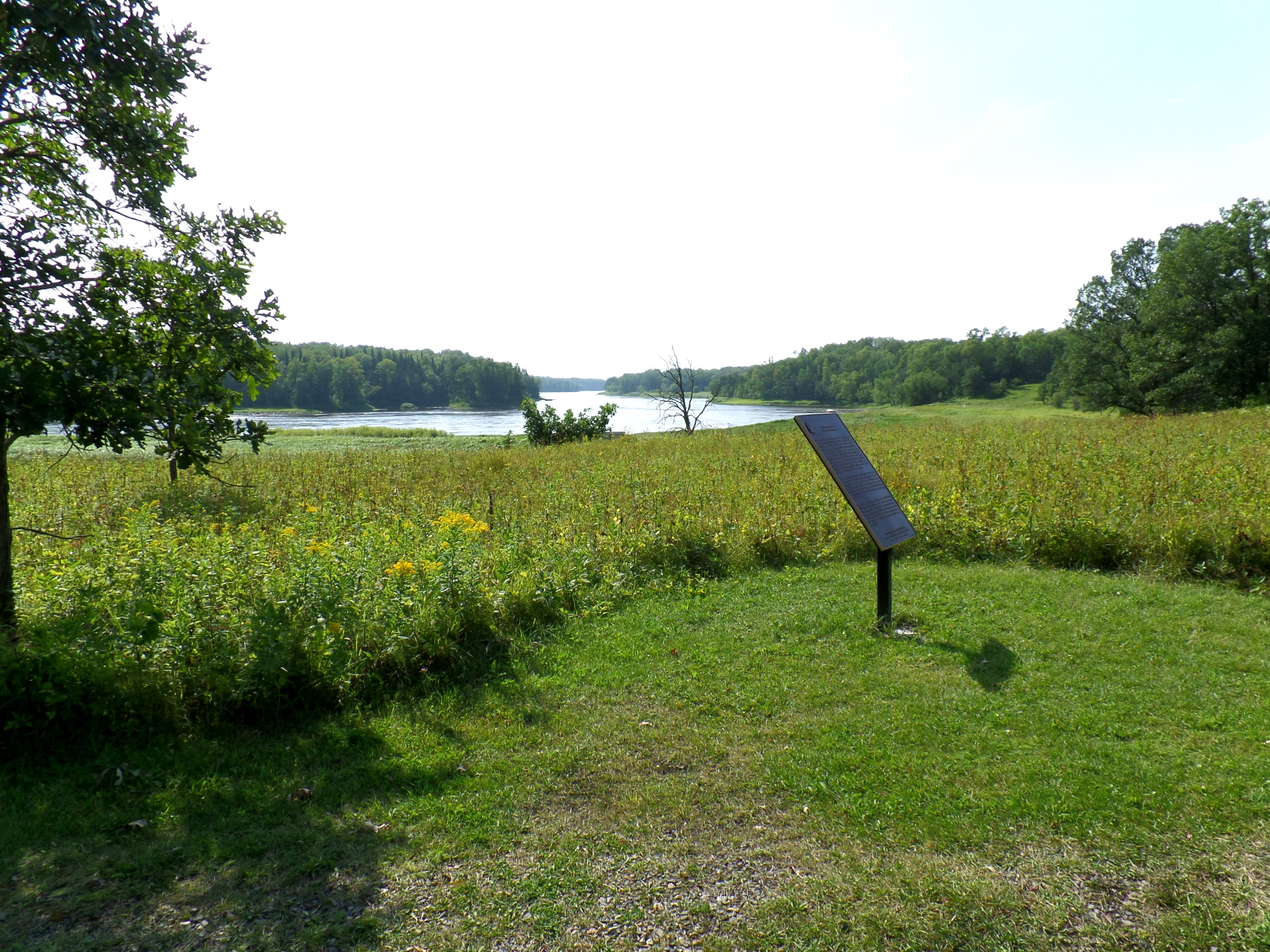
Burial mounds at Kay Nah Chi Wah Nung

AD 300: Peoples in this region survive by subsistence methods of hunting and fishing.

AD 300 to 1650: People camp during the summers at Manitou Rapids and Long Sault on the Rainy River to fish sturgeon, hunt moose and beaver, and bury their dead in burial mounds.

1650 to 1731: People living along the Rainy River trade with European traders for goods such as glass beads.

1732: The Rainy River becomes an important transportation route for the French travelling from Lake Superior to Lake Winnipeg and the Northwest Territories.

1763: The British claim dominion over Canada. The Royal Proclamation of 1763 establishes that land for European settlement at Rainy River must be purchased from the Ojibwe peoples by the Crown and places Anishinaabe peoples “under the protection” of the Crown, sparking the paternalist relationship that later characterizes Canadian governmental policy.

The Anishinaabe Nation in Treaty No. 3 became distinct as a political, cultural, and linguistic group from other Anishinaabe peoples through the circumstances of its traditional territory around Lake of the Woods and Rainy River. "Abundant natural resources were the foundation for the Anishinaabe government. The Anishinaabe peoples in this territory followed a seasonal round to tap a broad variety of natural resources. In the spring, large grounds gathered at maple sugar groves, rice fields, berry patches, garden sites, and fishing stations like the Manitou and Long Sault Rapids where they would capture the giant sturgeon. One sturgeon averaged 200 pounds in weight, each pound providing a nutritious 700 calories. In June, families planted gardens along the shores of Rainy River and Lake of the Woods. Corn, potatoes, pumpkins, onions, carrots, and beans were major crops, as well as a variety of berries such as blueberries, sand cherries, raspberries, black currants, and gooseberries. In the late summer and early fall, Anishinaabe peoples in this region mainly harvested wild rice. Because of the abundance of sturgeon, wild rice, and other resources in this region, the Anishinaabe peoples in Treaty No. 3 area maintained sovereign and independent from fur traders with control over their landscape. The Fur Trade helped Anishinaabe peoples maintain their culture and local economy while being incorporated into a transoceanic market. The negotiation of treaties like Treaty No. 3 greatly reduced Anishinaabe peoples’ access to the richest and most abundant bulk of their lands.

Organized through a Grand Council, they asserted sovereignty over their territory." By the latter 1800s, the Grand Council's insistence on territorial integrity was obstructing westward expansion to the Prairies. In the 1870s, Crown authorities pressed for a treaty.

== Making of the Treaty ==
A map showing the Numbered Treaties, including Treaty 3

In 1873, Alexander Morris was one of three Commissioners empowered by the Privy Council to make a treaty that would open up safe passage from Upper Canada via Lake Superior and the Rainy and Winnipeg Rivers to the Prairies. He understood the political structure of the Nation and dealt with the Council as the government of a people: "I then told them that I ... wished to treat with them as a nation and not with separate bands...." The North-West Angle Treaty (also known as Treaty 3) with the Crown was signed on 3 October 1873, thus securing access for the settlers to vast areas of land in what was to become modern Canada, and giving constitutional definition within both Anishinaabe law and Canadian law to the Anishinaabe Nation in Treaty No. 3. In his 1880 book on the Treaties of Canada with the Indians, Morris recounted that when, after difficult negotiations, the Treaty was concluded, the Council's "principal spokesman, Mawedopenais, came forward and drew off his gloves, and spoke as follows: 'Now you see me stand before you all: what has been done here today, has been done openly before the Great Spirit, and before the nation.'" Treaty 3 is the only one of the eleven Numbered Treaties of Canada that was made with a single distinct aboriginal people.

=== Treaty territory ===
The Treaty No. 3 area in what is referred to as Northwestern Ontario is an area rich with trees, water, rocks, and other resources that contributed to the survival of Anishinaabe peoples and the settlers that followed. Tensions rooted in differing cultural relations to the land between Indigenous nations and settlers exist to this day. In this region, Indigenous peoples operated sturgeon fisheries from at least 500 BCE and conducted a lucrative trade in sturgeon-based products like sturgeon oil which was used as medicine, a light source, a hide-softening agent, and machine oil. The Treaty covers traditional territory of the Anishinaabe people extending from Lake Superior in the east into what is now Manitoba to the west. With the stroke of a pen, Treaty 3 extended by 55,000 square miles (140,000 km^{2}) the area over which the Crown could, with apparent legitimacy, assert its sovereignty. Of immediate strategic significance, it secured friendly passage for Canada to open up the West.

== Post-Treaty experience ==
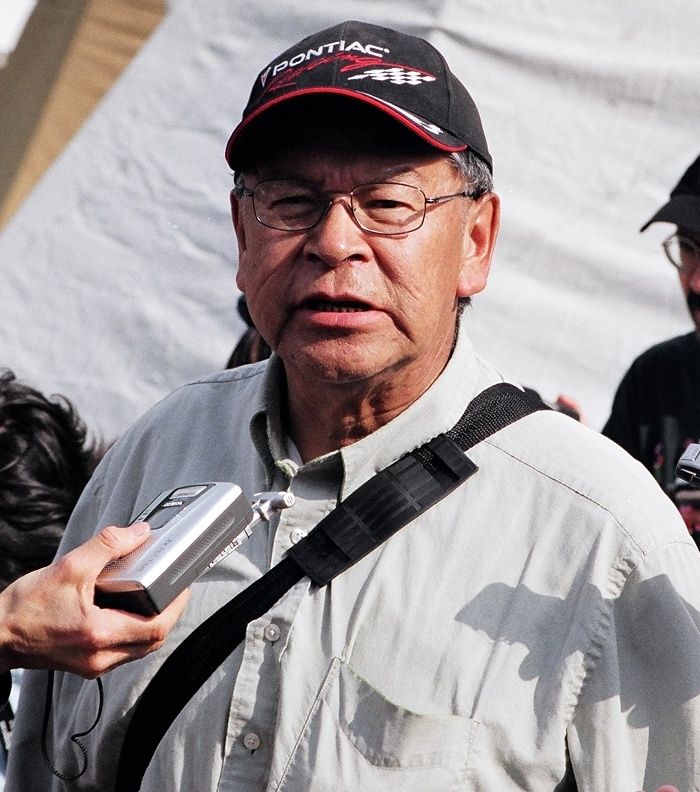
Elder Bill Fobister of Asubpeeschoseewagong First Nation (Grassy Narrows) speaking at a protest at Queen's Park, Toronto, Ontario, Canada.

Three years after Treaty 3 was solemnly signed, Canada enacted the Indian Act, which provided the legal and administrative basis for more than a century of colonial policies of dispossession, oppression and attempted cultural extinguishment of the Canadian Indian peoples. While the treaty guaranteed the Anishinaabe the “right to pursue their avocations of hunting and fishing throughout the tract surrendered,” these rights were and continue to be increasingly infringed upon by settler companies with the support of the Canadian government. For example, the members of Grassy Narrows First Nation living on Treaty #3 territory were able to maintain land and forest-based subsistence and practice until the 1960s when the Canadian government consolidated the Grassy Narrows population in 1963. Seven years later, the residents of Grassy Narrows would discover mercury had poisoned the English River, along with the fish inside it that many people in Grassy Narrows ate regularly, leading to disastrous effects on the community, such as increased drug and alcohol consumption. This is one of many examples of the rights guaranteed to the Anishinaabeg that have been violated since the establishment of Treaty #3.

In the 1990s, Grassy Narrows became an important space for Anishinaabeg and Indigenous resistance to settler encroachment. Unsustainable amounts of land were being clear-cut in Grassy Narrows, inhibiting the Anishinaabeg from exercising their treaty rights. Members began their opposition to the increased logging in the area by writing to logging companies and government officials and organizing peaceful protests, before filing a lawsuit in 1999. In 2002, a blockade was erected at Grassy Narrows, seeking to prohibit logging trucks and supplies from entering the area. The blockade asserted a full-time presence on the road for a full year, and its legacy as a place of Anishinaabeg resistance carries on to this day. In 2011, the 1999 lawsuit would culminate with a favourable decision for Grassy Narrows from Ontario’s Superior Court.

In 1998, Minister of Indian Affairs Jane Stewart, and in 2008, Canadian prime minister Stephen Harper, publicly acknowledged and apologized for central elements of these policies.

== Constitution ==
The Anishinaabe constitutional order emphasizes a tripartite framework of interdependence, mutual aid, and harmony, situating the democratic principle as a key element of Anishinaabe constitutionalism. The constitution of the Anishinaabe Nation in Treaty No. 3 is based on customary law that includes both sacred law and traditional law. While it is mostly uncodified, Anishinaabe principles of how to conduct oneself in relationships are passed down through aadizookaanan that reflect the constitutional order. Stories such as the Vision of Kitche Manitou, The Great Law, and Beaver Gives a Feast are passed down through oral tradition, reminding the Anishinaabe peoples of the significance of interdependence, mutual aid, and harmony. The Anishinaabe used aadizookaanan to remind themselves about how they are a piece within an interdependent ecosystem, wherein one must not take more than one needs. Anishinaabe creation stories, such as the Vision of Kitche Manitou, talk of how each creature and being was given their own gift; this idea correlates to the importance of mutual aid in the Anishinaabe constitutional order, as each being is expected to use their personal gifts to the benefit of others when needed. Harmony is the ultimate goal, achieved through synchronicity of interdependence and mutual aid, that comes naturally when all beings follow The Great Laws of Nature. Within Anishinaabe epistemology, harmony refers not to a state without conflict, but rather to a state without disconnection.

The importance of democracy within the Anishinaabe constitutional order cannot be overstated. It is more accurately compared to participatory democracy than representational democracy, as it is imperative that all actors are included in decision-making processes. The aadizookaanan The Great Law and Beaver Gives a Feast demonstrate the importance of the democratic principle within the Anishinaabe constitutional order. The animals in the story understand the importance of the inclusion of all community members and the diffusion of power throughout the community, instead of a hegemonic ruler. The making of Treaty 3 fundamentally affected the constitution of the Nation. The Anishinaabe Nation in Treaty No. 3 is one of few sovereign Anishinaabe Nations whose constitutionally-distinct identity was confirmed in making a Treaty with the Crown. The making of Treaty 3 constitutionally severed the Anishinaabe Nation in Treaty 3 from its Anishinaabe relatives and set it on a distinct future path. Significantly, not all the Chiefs were present for the momentous Treaty 3 decision. Others subscribed to it later. These events illustrated a unique and foundational principle of the Nation's constitution: the primacy of its communities. According to this principle, while laws and national policy of the Nation do not require the consent of its communities to become effective for the Nation, they become effective for and in each community only when the community has consented.

== Aboriginal and treaty rights ==
The Crown has fundamental rights under Treaty 3. These include the right of Canadians to enter and live peacefully in Treaty 3 territory and to share its natural resources. Because Treaty 3 was made with a single aboriginal people, it is clear that the Anishinaabe Nation in Treaty No. 3 is the "rights-holder" for the collective aboriginal and treaty rights of its citizens. In general, such rights are held by an aboriginal people of Canada (not a Band). Aboriginal rights of the Nation include specific (local) rights and generic rights such as:

- the right to conclude treaties,
- the right to customary law,
- the right to the fiduciary protection of the Crown,
- the right to an ancestral territory,
- the right of cultural integrity,
- the right to a moderate livelihood, and
- the right of self-government.

Since 1982, the Nation's aboriginal and treaty rights, including its treaty right to exist as an aboriginal people in Canada, have been recognized and affirmed by section 35 of the Constitution Act, 1982. Responsibilities of the Nation's government include protection of aboriginal rights and honoring Treaty relationships with the Crown and with other aboriginal peoples. When the Crown proposes actions that may affect treaty or aboriginal rights, such as changes to governance laws or child protection laws, or licenses for forestry or permits for mining in Treaty 3 territory, it must consult with the Nation through its government and accommodate or compensate potentially affected rights.

== Traditional government ==
All legal and governmental systems, including the Canadian legal system, are grounded in a peoples’ ontologies, cosmologies, and epistemologies. The Anishinaaabemowin phrase, w’daeb’awae, means “he or she is telling the truth, is correct, is right.” The truth referred to in this phrase is not the standard western perception of truth as an objective and absolute set of facts that exists independently of knowers, but a qualified truth framed by the speaker’s experience, perception and language. W’daeb’awae and Aadizookaanan, or stories, reflect the Anshinaabe nation's constitutional order, which gives rise to Anishinaabe legal processes and forms of governance. The goal of political governance in Anishinaabe constitutional order is harmony. Harmony does not refer to a lack of conflict, but to a web of relationships in which each member’s needs are met and rely upon others.

Grand Council Treaty No. 3 is the traditional government of the Nation. Alexander Morris' records of his dealings with the Grand Council in 1873 recount details of his dealings with what he called "the Indian Council": "The nation had not met for many years, and some of [the Chiefs] had never before been assembled together." The origins of the Grand Council may predate written records. Historically, "The sturgeon during spring spawning season supported the assembly of up to 1,500 people at fishing stations on Rainy River. At Couchiching Falls (present-day Fort Frances), the Anishinaabe national government met each spring, relying upon abundant spawning runs of sturgeon and stored supplies of manoomin, maple sugar and Indian corn." Traditionally, "Anishinaabe of Lake of the Woods and Rainy Lake had many different types of leaders, including Grand Chief, first and second rank civil chiefs, first and second rank soldiers, war chiefs, pipe bearers and messengers." The government of the Nation derived from and rested upon consent of the people. "Traditional values featured a distrust of excessive power and an emphasis upon consensual, rather than representative, democracy." The Midewiwin Society, though systematically persecuted by colonial authorities, was also an integral part of the Nation's government: "The Midewiwin or Grand Medicine Society, a ranked curing society, operated in conjunction with the Grand Council, and many of its healers were also powerful chiefs such as Powawassin and Mawintopinesse. The annual spring Grand Council on Rainy River was also the occasion of Mide ceremonial activity."

== Modern government ==
Today, Grand Council Treaty #3 continues to be composed of the many councils of the Nation. Government of the Nation continues to be based on consensual democracy. The National Assembly, comprising leaders sent by each community according to its own determination, including elders, women and other leaders assembled in the presence of constitutional symbols of the Nation, determines national policy by consensus. The National Assembly selects the Ogichidaa/kwe. There is no fixed term; the National Assembly may reconsider its selection at any time. The Ogichidaa/kwe appoints members of an executive council and answers to the National Assembly for their performance. The executive council exercises the executive authority of the Nation. While its members may be local political figures, in their executive capacity they have fiduciary duties to the Nation as a whole. There is also an administration of similar name (Grand Council of Treaty 3) that is supposed to be dedicated solely to preserve and protect the Treaty and its rights, but against the opinion of many Chiefs has branched out into service delivery.

== See also ==
- Weechi-it-te-win Family Services
- Story Nations | Kiinawin Kawindomowin
- Grand Council Treaty #3
