= Canadian Journal of Administrative Law and Practice =

Law journal

- Language: English, French
- Edited by: Margaret Leighton

Publication details
- Publisher: Carswell on behalf of the Council of Canadian Administrative Tribunals (Canada)
- Frequency: Triannually

Standard abbreviations
- ISO 4: Can. J. Adm. Law Pract.

Indexing
- ISSN: 0835-6742

Links
- Journal homepage

The Canadian Journal of Administrative Law and Practice is a law journal published three times a year by Carswell on behalf of the Council of Canadian Administrative Tribunals. It "[p]rovides a forum for in-depth discussion of administrative law issues and emphasizes the important role played by tribunals, boards and commissions in the administrative process". The journal publishes articles, case comments, practice notes, and book reviews. The majority of papers are in English with the remainder in French. All abstracts are in French and English. The editor-in-chief is Margaret Leighton.
