= Bone Black (novel) =

2019 novel by Carol Rose GoldenEagle

- First edition
- Author: Carol Rose GoldenEagle
- Genre: mystery
- Publisher: Nightwood Editions
- Publication date: 2019
- ISBN: 9780889713659

Bone Black is a novel, published in 2019, by Canadian author Carol Rose GoldenEagle.

In a long interview with Shelagh Rogers GoldenEagle described her experience in the decades as a journalist of First Nations women being covered only as victims. They discussed the long history of prejudice against First Nations women. They discussed the long history of police inaction in the investigation of missing First Nations women.

== Plot ==
Wren is devastated when her twin sister, Raven, mysteriously disappears after the two spend an evening visiting at a local pub. When Wren files a missing persons report with the local police, she is dismissed and becomes convinced the case will not be properly investigated. As she follows media reports, Wren realizes that the same heartbreak she's feeling is the same for too many families, indeed for whole Nations. Something within Wren snaps and she decides to take justice into her own hands. She soon disappears into a darkness, struggling to come to terms with the type of justice she delivers. Throughout her choices, and every step along the way, Wren feels as though she is being guided. But, by what?

== Reviews ==
The Regina Leader-Post wrote: "Wren is a deep character, and GoldenEagle’s prose is vivid with a hint of poetry."
