= Sixties Scoop =

Canadian policy of forcibly putting Indigenous children up for adoption

The Sixties Scoop (French: Rafle des années 60), also known as The Scoop, refers to a series of policies which were enacted in Canada that enabled child welfare authorities to take, or "scoop up", Indigenous children from their families and communities for placement in foster homes, from which they would be adopted by white families.

Despite its name referencing the 1960s, the Sixties Scoop began in the mid-to-late 1950s and persisted into the 1980s. It is estimated that a total of 20,000 Indigenous children were taken from their families and fostered or adopted out primarily to white middle-class families.

Each province had different foster programs and adoption policies; Saskatchewan had the only targeted indigenous transracial adoption program, the Adopt Indian Métis (AIM) Program. The term "Sixties Scoop" itself was coined in the early 1980s by social workers in the British Columbia Department of Social Welfare to describe their own department's practice of child apprehension.

The phrase first appears in print in a 1983 report commissioned by the Canadian Council on Social Development, titled "Native Children and the Child Welfare System", in which researcher Patrick Johnston noted the source for the term and adopted its usage. It is similar to the term "Baby Scoop Era," which refers to the period from the late 1950s to the 1980s in which large numbers of children were taken from unmarried mothers for adoption.

The government policies that led to the Sixties Scoop were discontinued in the mid-1980s, after Ontario chiefs had passed resolutions against them, and a Manitoba judicial inquiry had harshly condemned them. Associate Chief Judge Edwin C. Kimelman headed the Manitoba inquiry, which resulted in the publication of "No quiet place / Review Committee on Indian and Metis Adoptions and Placements", better known as the "Kimelman Report".

Multiple lawsuits have since been filed in Canada by former wards of the Sixties Scoop, including a series of class-action lawsuits launched in five provinces, such as the one filed in British Columbia in 2011. Beaverhouse First Nation Chief Marcia Brown Martel was the lead plaintiff in the class-action lawsuit filed in Ontario in 2009. On 14 February 2017, Ontario Superior Court Justice Edward Belobaba ruled that the government was liable for the harm caused by the Sixties Scoop; and on 6 October 2017, an $800-million settlement was announced for the Martel case.

As Métis and non-status First Nations people are currently excluded from the agreement, National Indigenous Survivors of Child Welfare Network—a group led by Sixties Scoop survivors based in Ottawa—has advocated for the settlement to be rejected unless it includes all Indigenous people who were taken from their homes and forcibly adopted.

== History ==
=== Background: Residential schools and the expansion of child welfare ===
The residential school system in Canada was inspired by the Report on Industrial Schools for Indians and Half-Breeds by Nicholas Flood Davin in 1879. This report was a survey conducted by Davin in the United States following their respective Indian residential school system. Davin thought that the Indian adult was unable to be assimilated into Euro-Canadian society, placing emphasis on the child generation.

The beginning of the Sixties Scoop coincided with Indigenous families dealing with the fall-out of the residential school project which had negative results on their social, economic, and living conditions. Residential schools eventually lost popularity in favor of assimilating indigenous children into provincial schools with the goal of integration of these children into Euro-Canadian civilization. This would lead to the beginning of the closure of residential schools in 1948 - a process which wouldn't be complete until 1996 when the last school closed. Canada's residential school system was implemented by the federal government and administered by various churches.

Its purpose was to remove Aboriginal children from their homes and reserves, so they could teach them Euro-Canadian and Christian values. The policies forbade the children from speaking their own languages, contacting their family, or from acknowledging their culture in any way. Despite the collective efforts of Indigenous people connecting and writing their history, the government considered their oral history as biased or unreliable.

Survivors of the residential schools have come forward and spoken out about physical, spiritual, sexual, and psychological abuse that they experienced at the hand of the residential school staff. The lasting cultural impact on First Nations, Métis, and Inuit families and communities has been widespread and extensive.

The Sixties Scoop was an era in Canadian child welfare between the late 1950s to the early 1980s, in which the child welfare system removed Indigenous children from their families and communities in large numbers and placed them in non-Indigenous foster homes or adoptive families, institutions, and residential schools. The Sixties Scoop was further precipitated by the introduction of child welfare services on reserves where social workers argued that Indigenous children were not offered equal services on reserves as non-Indigenous children through provincial social services.

=== Policies ===
During the Sixties Scoop, children were forcibly apprehended from their Native land and community for an extended period of time, often without knowledge or consent from their families or tribes. Siblings were often intentionally sent to different regions in order to eliminate any form of communication with their families. Residential schools pushed for the transitioning of culture from children by feeding them information that aligns with their policies, as it would "kill the Indian in the child." These children were not allowed to know of their real nationality, history, or family.

When a child wanted to know their cultural identity, they would have to receive consent from their biological parents. Since the government made sure there was no connection between the children and their biological family, they were never able to actually open their birth records. Thus, the children suspected their cultural heritage, but were unable to confirm or deny it with any evidence.

=== Increase in apprehensions ===
The Canadian government started to close the compulsory residential school system in the 1950s and the 1960s, but the government authorities thought that Aboriginal children would benefit from a better education in the public school system.

By every indicator, health, employment, income, education, and housing left Indigenous people, far from being assimilated, were still separate and second-class citizens. The social, economic, and political outcome with the political assumption that poverty was growing from Indigenous culture, but it was the discrimination and displacement that placed them in these positions.

According to one summary:

This transition to provincial services led to a 1951 [Indian Act] amendment that enabled the Province to provide services to Aboriginal people where none existed federally. Child protection was one of these areas. In 1951, twenty-nine Aboriginal children were in provincial care in British Columbia; by 1964, that number was 1,466. Aboriginal children, who had comprised only 1 percent of all children in care, came to make up just over 34 percent.

Canada's Truth and Reconciliation Commission (TRC), a component of the Indian Residential Schools Settlement Agreement, was mandated to document the experiences of Indigenous children in residential schools and to share the truth of survivors, families, communities, and others affected with all Canadians. According to the TRC Commission's final report, published in 2015:

By the end of the 1970s, the transfer of children from residential schools was nearly complete in Southern Canada, and the impact of the Sixties Scoop was in evidence across the country.

=== Resistance ===
First Nations consistently fought to resist these policies in a variety of ways, including the courts (Natural Parents v. Superintendent of Child Welfare, 1976, 60 D.L.R. 3 rd 148 S.C.C) and with their own policies, such the Spallumcheen Indian Band's individual by-law to organize its own child welfare program, with varying degrees of success. Resistance by parents and students did not change the overall pattern of persistent abuse. Any act of defiance may have placed students in unfavorable positions of treatment. Still, thousands of children were always within the policies and conditions that remained to define the forced civilization.

First Nations communities responded to the loss of their children and the resulting cultural genocide by repatriating children whose adoptions failed and working to regain control over child welfare practices related to their children, which started in 1973 with the Blackfoot (Siksika) child welfare agreement in Alberta. There are about 125 First Nations Child and Family Service Agencies across Canada, but they operate through a patchwork of agreements that give them authority from the provincial government to provide services and funding from the federal government.

== Adopt Indian Métis program ==
Funded by the Canadian and Saskatchewan governments, the Adopt Indian Métis (AIM) was a program that was started to promote the adoption of First Nations children by middle-class white families in 1967. The project was started by Otto Driedger, who later become Director of Child Welfare for Saskatchewan, and Frank Dornstauder. AIM was the only targeted Indigenous transracial adoption program in Canada.

CBC News produced a television segment about the AIM after the project's first year, in May 1968. It showed several Indian and Métis children playing as the reporter, Craig Oliver, told viewers that they represented only a few of the hundreds of First Nations children ages six weeks to six years who are in need of homes. He stated that there has been an increase in the number of children from these communities who are up for adoption because of the rise in illegitimate births and marriage breakdowns among Indian and Métis people. The government had been taking in nearly 200 children each year as wards of the state and was having difficulty finding permanent homes for them. The news report portrayed the AIM program as a solution to the problem and focused on its quantifiable results by placing 100 children, including several family groups of children, in its first year.

When CBC News ran the segment, all of the children remained with their adoptive families. The program advertised the availability of the Indian and the Métis children for adoption by a marketing campaign with radio, television, and newspaper advertising. The large photographs of these children that ran in provincial newspapers with the AIM advertisements were said to be the most effective aspect of its outreach to prospective families. The program also promised fast adoptions, with completion of the process within as few as 10 weeks.

The original AIM program ran through 1969 and resulted in an increased interest in transracial adoptions. The focus of the program was broadened in 1970 to include all children, but it continued to over-represent First Nations children given the high number that were taken into custody by social workers in Saskatchewan. For example, in 1969, Indian and Métis people represented only 7.5% of the population of Saskatchewan, but their children accounted for 41.9% of all children in foster homes in the province.

In 1971, the Métis Society in Saskatoon formed a Métis Foster Home Committee, led by Howard Adams, Phyllis Trochie, Nora Thibodeau, and Vicki Raceme. Its purpose was to challenge the AIM program and research the creation of a Métis-controlled foster home program. Those leading the committee saw the AIM program as detrimental to children, parents and the Métis community. They said that the AIM's advertising campaign was racist, specifically because it implied Métis parents were unable to look after their children, portrayed First Nations children as inferior and unwanted, and suggested that any white family could be accepted for adoptions.

A CBC News segment in 1971 by reporter John Warren stated that 500 children had found permanent homes through the AIM program. An unidentified man representing the AIM that Warren interviewed said that the increased adoptions of Indian and Métis children was caused not by prior prejudice but by the increased awareness of their availability for adoption, adding that 170 children up to 10 were in need of homes. Further, the AIM representative stated that four years earlier, "children of native origin" had represented only one in ten of the children adopted in Saskatchewan and for the past two years had represented one in four of the children adopted in the province.

The AIM representative said that though it was not the primary goal of the program, he hoped that the AIM would help people of different races understand each other. In his report, Warren also mentioned that First Nations leaders were criticizing the AIM as an attempt at integration and were drafting complaints about the program to bring to federal and provincial leaders.

A CBC Radio podcast series, Missing and Murdered: Finding Cleo, takes an in-depth look at the experience of a Cree girl named Cleopatra (Cleo) Nicotine Semaganis. In 1974, at the age of nine, Cleo was removed from her family in Saskatchewan as part of the AIM program. The family never saw her again and wanted to know what had happened to her.

The series website includes images of the AIM newspaper advertisements featuring photographs and personal and health information about the Indian and Métis children available for adoption. It also includes an internal memo, dated 25 September 1973, from AIM director G. E. Jacob, that recommended as an Award of Merit to a supervisor in North Battleford, Saskatchewan, Mrs. D. Wilson, as Salesperson of the Year. That award was to recognize the number of children that she made wards of the province and eligible for adoption.

== Numbers involved ==
In 1977, about 15,500 Indigenous children were in the care of child welfare authorities, an estimate based on data from Indian and Northern Affairs, Health and Welfare Canada, Statistics Canada, and provincial departments of social services. They represented 20% of all Canadian children living in care, even though Indigenous children made up less than 5% of the total child population.

In 1983, Patrick Johnston, then a program director at the Canadian Council on Social Development, coined the term "Sixties Scoop" in a report on Aboriginal child welfare, titled "Native Children and the Child Welfare System". His research found that Aboriginal children were being disproportionately taken into the child welfare system.

Johnston, in researching his report, collected statistical data from various stakeholders within the community, including different levels of government, Aboriginal organizations, and band councils. He got the idea for the term "Sixties Scoop" from a social worker who disclosed "with tears in her eyes – that it was common practice in BC in the mid-sixties to 'scoop' from their mothers on reserves almost all newly born children. She was crying because she realized – 20 years later – what a mistake that had been."

The proportion of children in care who were Aboriginal was 40–50% in Alberta; 60–70% in Saskatchewan; and 50–60% in Manitoba. According to the Aboriginal Justice Implementation Commission, "Johnston estimated that, across Canada, Aboriginal children were 4.5 times more likely than non-Aboriginal children to be in the care of child welfare authorities." Similar findings have been reported by other experts.

Most of the children who were removed by social workers did not return to their communities. A 1980 study by the Canadian Council on Social Development found that 78% of status First Nations children who were adopted were placed with non-Indigenous families.

Raven Sinclair, an associate professor at the University of Regina and a member of Gordon First Nation, wrote an article titled Identity lost and found: Lessons from The Sixties Scoop in which she discusses the broader context of the term:

At the same time as we may be alarmed by the statistics, it is important to recognize that the Sixties Scoop was not a specific child welfare program or policy. It names one segment of a larger period in Aboriginal child welfare history where, because questionable apprehensions and adoptions figured prominently, a label was applied. The "Sixties Scoop" has evolved as a descriptor that is now applied to the whole of the Aboriginal child welfare era, simplistically defined here as roughly the time from the waning of residential schools to the mid-1980s period of child welfare devolution and last closings of Indian residential schools ... The white social worker, following on the heels of the missionary, the priest and the Indian agent, was convinced that the only hope for the salvation of the Indian people lay in the removal of their children.

== Kimelman Report ==
A judicial inquiry over the "Sixties Scoop" in Manitoba was headed by Associate Chief Judge Edwin C. Kimelman. The inquiry resulted in the 1985 publication of "No quiet place / Review Committee on Indian and Metis Adoptions and Placements", better known as the "Kimelman Report".

The Kimelman Report was a strong critique of both the existing child welfare system in Manitoba and the practices of its social workers and agencies:

Rather, it is believed that every level of personnel in the child welfare system has been so free of examination for so long that the least attention was viewed as negative criticism. Staff seemed unable to recognize that public examination of the system was long overdue.

The Report included the following allegations against child welfare policies in the province:

The native people of Manitoba had charged that the interpretation of the term "best interest of the child" had been wrought with cultural bias in a system dominated by white, middle class workers, boards of directors, administrators, lawyers and judges. They also alleged that in application of the legislation, there were many factors which were crucially important to the native people which had been ignored, misinterpreted, or simply not recognized by the child welfare system.

It found that Manitoba's non-Indigenous agencies often required single, Indigenous mothers to live on their own, as opposed to in traditional, multi-generational households, to regain custody of their children.

This demand goes against the native patterns of child care. In the native tradition, the need of a young mother to be mothered herself is recognized. The grandparents and aunts and uncles expect the demands and rewards of raising the new member of the family. To insist that the mother remove herself from the support of her family when she needs them most is unrealistic and cruel.

Membership changes in the new Indian Act also prevented single Indigenous mothers from living with their children on reserves and complicated placements with family members. Mothers who chose to remain on reserves with their children had to first prove that the father of their children had First Nations status. Additionally, children of unmarried First Nations mothers often could not be placed with families on reserves due to these same membership stipulations.

The Kimelman Report included 109 recommendations to address issues that ranged from cultural sensitivity to maintenance of family ties, formal training for professionals, structure of the system, and having records accessible by computer. It went on to refer to the loss of the children as a "cultural genocide." A 1989 follow-up report published in the Canadian Journal of Native Studies by the Manitoba Métis Federation indicated that the situation had not improved but in some ways was becoming more problematic for Métis children.

Deanna Reder, a Cree-Métis associate professor in the Departments of First Nations Studies and English at Simon Fraser University, wrote in her 2007 PhD thesis that adult adoptees who were affected by these policies have begun to speak out about their losses: loss of their cultural identity, lost contact with their natural families, barred access from medical histories, and for status Indian children, the loss of their status.

== Long-term effects ==
Canada's Truth and Reconciliation Commission (TRC) documented the experiences of Indigenous children who were removed from their families and placed in residential schools by the government. TRC Commissioners, who were tasked with sharing this knowledge with all Canadians, focused on child welfare in the first five of 94 calls to action in their final report. Published in 2015, the TRC report addresses the effects of the Sixties Scoop as well that of residential schools on Indigenous communities:

The effects of residential schools and the Sixties Scoop on Aboriginal people and their families resulted in generational and historical trauma that negatively affected parenting skills, social values, economic conditions, and future success. This trauma has caused overwhelming rates of suicide, homicide, depression, substance abuse, alcoholism, child abuse, domestic violence, struggles of self-identity, and other social problems. These factors, combined with prejudicial attitudes toward Aboriginal parenting skills and a tendency to see Aboriginal poverty as a symptom of neglect, and self-inflicting rather than as a consequence of failed government policies which have resulted in grossly disproportionate rates of child apprehension among Aboriginal people.

According to Shandel Valiquette, “[In] residential schools they learned that adults often exert power and control through abuse. The lessons learned in childhood are often repeated in adulthood with the result that many survivors of the residential school system often inflict abuse on their own children.” Stereotypes about Indigenous people lead child welfare workers to more quickly decide to remove children from contemporary homes. Stereotypes around First Nations addiction are frequently repeated with no discussion of the trauma created by government policies like the Sixties Scoop.

The negative impact of scooping children away from their families can never be overstated. Such action of kidnapping kids and keeping them away from practicing their cultural values has resulted in the destruction of their social and political structure which was the norm of the Aboriginal communities. This has also resulted in the disruption of the transmission of knowledge that was passed on to the Indigenous children through the telling of stories and values of families, the importance of the elderly, importance of communities over individualism as is the case in the white communities.

As a consequence, many children who were placed in homes during the '60s Scoop have their group identity and cultural knowledge stolen from them.

The aftereffects of the Sixties Scoop remain an issue in child welfare provision for Aboriginal communities in Canada. Scholar Chris Walmsley notes in Protecting Aboriginal Children (2011) that some social workers find themselves in a similar alienated relationship to communities. Walmsley referred to one heavily publicised incident in which 71 children were removed from a community in 1998 (though not all were Aboriginal). One Aboriginal childcare worker said "to me it was very shocking ... it reminded me of the Sixties Scoop when kids on-reserve were taken without even their parents being aware of them [being] taken." Walmsley commented that "the condition of victimisation is recreated for the community every time a social worker parachutes into a community, makes a brief assessment, and then leaves with all the children at risk. This form of practice often reactivates the sixties scoop in the minds of the community."

Walmsley noted, however, that there is a reverse problem of Aboriginal children in care now being often "off-loaded" onto Aboriginal communities that do not have the resources to deal with them, a process that can exacerbate problems in fragile communities by introducing troubled children with no meaningful ties beyond ethnicity.

A 2011 Statistics Canada study found 14,225, or 3.6%, of all First Nations children aged 14 and under are in foster care, compared with 15,345, or 0.3%, of non-Indigenous children.

Canada's 1.4 million First Nations, Inuit, and Métis people disproportionately experience poor living conditions and substandard schooling, among other issues. A 2016 study by the Canadian Centre for Policy Alternatives found that 51% of First Nations children live in poverty. That increases to 60% for First Nations children who live on reserves, with poverty rates reaching 76% in Manitoba and 69% in Saskatchewan for First Nations children living on reserves. The study found poverty rates of 30% for non-status First Nations children, 25% for Inuit children, and 23% for Métis children. (Canada has an overall child poverty rate of 18%, ranking it 27th in the 34 countries in the Organisation for Economic Co-operation and Development.)

Some foster parents have tried to incorporate the native culture of the children while raising them, but the effects of being physically placed in the foster care systems have continued to negatively impact them. Predominantly white adoptive parents were lacking information about indigenous culture, thus were unable to provide supportive role modelling to sway the children’s feelings on the discrimination they experienced outside the home. In scenarios where children do manage to adopt their non-Indigenous families culture, they still find themselves experiencing an identity crisis because of not envisioning what it meant to be Indigenous.

One specific example of how the Sixties Scoop affected children throughout their lives is Rose Henry. She was placed in her adoptive parents' home when she was 8 years old after being apprehended by Canadian government officials in 1966. The foster mother understood the extreme need that Rose had to keep in touch with her biological parents. For the whole of the ten years that she stayed with her foster family, they would make sure that she had some kind of interaction with her biological family. Unfortunately, Rose still ended up homeless due to the everlasting impacts of the Sixties Scoop. She felt torn between her two identities, unsure of where she fits in. She explained that "Going through the Scoop left me wondering which world or culture I belonged in: white Canadian or First Nations community. I was torn between the two. It has had a very damaging effect on me; society told me you’re brown on the outside and white in the middle (as I was brought up in a white home). I was confused and lost, and it was this path that ultimately led me to my life on the streets."

In other cases, adoptive or foster parents would lie to the children by telling them they were Italian or French instead. This was another example of disconnecting these children from their culture and the extent they have gone through in order to inflict cultural genocide. This has compounded the struggle of the First Nations people's self-identity that still affects them up to this day.

Cindy Blackstock PhD, the executive director of the First Nations Child & Family Caring Society of Canada and a professor in the School of Social Work at McGill University, claims that funding for child and family services on reserves is insufficient. She believes that the Canadian government's funding amounts to discrimination against First Nations children. Canadian government documents support Blackstock's statements and show that Indigenous agencies receive 22–34% less in funding than provincial agencies.

Blackstock's organization and the Assembly of First Nations, a political organization representing all First Nations in Canada, took that concern to the Canadian Human Rights Commission in 2007. Their complaint, which alleged that the Canadian government had a longstanding pattern of providing less government funding for child welfare services to First Nations children on reserves than is provided to non-Indigenous children, was referred to the Canadian Human Rights Tribunal.

The tribunal ruled in January 2016 that the Canadian government's failure to provide equitable and culturally based child welfare services to 165,000 First Nations children amounted to discrimination. The government has spent at least $5 million fighting the complaint and has not acted on that and three subsequent noncompliance orders.

On August 25, 2017, the United Nations Committee on the Elimination of Racial Discrimination (CERD) recommended for Canada to end its underfunding of First Nations, Inuit and Métis child and family services; ensure that all children, on and off reserve, have access to all services available to other children in Canada, without discrimination; implement Jordan's Principle fully to ensure access to services is not delayed or denied because of funding disputes between the federal, provincial and territorial governments; and address the root causes of displacement, such as poverty and poor housing, that disproportionately drive Indigenous children into foster care.

== Notable people affected ==
- Richard Cardinal, a Métis child, was born in Fort Chipewyan, Alberta. He entered the foster care system when he was four years old. In the care of Alberta Child Welfare, he had a total of 28 group care and foster placements, secured facilities and shelters. At 17, Richard hanged himself on June 26, 1984. A 1986 film made about his short life, Richard Cardinal: Cry from a Diary of a Métis Child, was based on his personal diary and interviews with his brother Charlie and his foster parents.
- Sydney Dion is an aboriginal man from Manitoba who was adopted by a family in the United States in 1971. The CBC program 8th Fire features his story about coming back to Canada. Dion saved his money so that he could find his family in Canada. When he arrived at the border, he was turned down: "they are aware that I was born here, but I am not a citizen here." He did not have a Canadian birth certificate, and his name had been changed. Therefore, he had no proof that he is a Canadian citizen. On his second try to get into Canada, he was successful. The border guard acknowledged that he was a minor when he was adopted and did not implicitly consent to becoming a United States resident and so allowed him to enter Canada without a passport.
- Taber Gregory was born Henry Desjarlais on the Cold Lake Nation in Alberta, and was adopted by the Gregory family of Wilton, Connecticut through the Pearl S. Buck Adoption Agency in Pennsylvania. Now the owner of the family's saw mill business, he became the first child placed in the United States as part of the Sixties Scoop to be recognized by the Truth and Reconciliation Commission of Canada in 2011, and has since been granted expedited U.S. citizenship.
- Wayne Snellgrove became the first child placed in the United States as part of the Sixties Scoop to be recognized by Canadian courts, in January 2015, via a civil class action suit served on the Federal Government of Canada.
- Eric Schweig, Canadian Inuvialuk actor known for The Last of the Mohicans, was adopted out at six months old as part of the Sixties Scoop. All seven of Schweig's biological mother's children were stolen from her, and she died of alcoholism in 1989. Eric never met her. "She didn’t drink a drop of alcohol until we were taken away," says Schweig. "We were part of the whole assimilation program—forcibly taken away, although my adoptive parents told me I wasn't." Schweig was subject to horrific abuse by his adoptive family. In recent years, he has spent a lot of time mentoring First Nations youth and tackling social issues that such painful policies as the Scoop have scarred Native societies with.
- Betty Ann Adam, a journalist with The StarPhoenix, collaborated with filmmaker Tasha Hubbard on Birth of a Family, a National Film Board of Canada documentary about her own separation and reunification with three of her siblings. The film premiered at the 2017 Hot Docs Canadian International Documentary Festival. Adam approached Hubbard to document her story at the urging of a commissioner who served on Canada's Truth and Reconciliation Commission.
- Nakuset, who is Cree from La Ronge, Saskatchewan, was adopted by a Jewish family in Montreal when she was three. She is now the executive director of the Native Women's Shelter of Montréal and draws on her adoptee experience in her work to improve the lives of urban Aboriginals. She sits on the Steering Committee of the Montréal Urban Aboriginal Community Strategy Network. Nakuset produced and hosted the television series Indigenous Power and was voted "Woman of the Year 2014" by the Montreal Council of Women. Part of her biography was used in the TV series Little Bird.
- Carol Rose GoldenEagle was born in 1963 in a religious hospital to a First Nations woman who was an unmarried nurse. Hospital authorities stripped her from her mother. She wrote Bearskin Diary, a novel with a strong autobiographical component inspired by this episode of her life.
- Gordon Edwin Sanderson, a formerly unidentified Canadian murder victim who was found in a septic tank in 1977 at Lindbrook, Alberta. The investigation into his homicide is ongoing.

== Ontario class action lawsuit ==
In 2009, Beaverhouse First Nation Chief Marcia Brown Martel filed a class action lawsuit in Ontario on behalf of Indigenous children affected by the Sixties Scoop. Her lawsuit, which claimed that she suffered emotional, physical, and sexual abuse after she was placed in the foster system as a child, was one of a series of class action lawsuits that had been launched in five provinces.

On February 14, 2017, Superior Court Justice Edward Belobaba ruled in favour of the plaintiffs in the case known as Brown v. Canada (Attorney General). Justice Belobaba found that Canada had breached its common law duty of care to

take reasonable steps to prevent on-reserve Indian children in Ontario, who had been placed in the care of non-aboriginal foster or adoptive parents, from losing their aboriginal identity.

Justice Belobaba, in his decision, also acknowledged the impact of the Sixties Scoop on survivors:

The Sixties Scoop happened and great harm was done ... The uncontroverted evidence of the plaintiff's experts is that the loss of their Aboriginal identity left the children fundamentally disoriented, with a reduced ability to lead healthy and fulfilling lives. The loss of Aboriginal identity resulted in psychiatric disorders, substance abuse, unemployment, violence and numerous suicides.

Indigenous Affairs Minister Carolyn Bennett, in interviews after the outcome was announced, stated that Canada would not appeal the decision.

On October 6, 2017, an $800 million settlement was announced. It will provide status First Nations and Inuit who were adopted out of their families and communities as part of the Sixties Scoop, with $25,000 to $50,000 in compensation, depending on the number of claimants who come forward. It will also establish a $50 million endowment for an Indigenous Healing Foundation. Non-status First Nations and Métis will not receive compensation under the settlement.

Jeffery Wilson, the lead attorney for the plaintiffs, made this comment about the settlement:

Never before in history has a nation recognized, in this way, children's right to their cultural identities, and a government's responsibility to do everything in its power to protect the cultural identity of children in its care.

Hundreds of claims have been rejected, and can be appealed if more proof is found. As part of the Sixties Scoop, Debbie Paul was taken by a nun from the Canadian residential school she attended and placed with a family in the United States, where she attended one school year. Her claim for compensation was rejected with the words "unable to confirm that you were placed in long-term care with non-indigenous parents". After her claim was rejected, with the help of a journalist she travelled to the town in the United States where she had lived, and managed to obtain her school records which she had previously attempted to obtain without success, and which stated as guardian the name of one of the parents of the family she had been placed with. Obtaining the records was an emotional moment for her. It wasn't about the money; it was about being believed. Finally she had proof that her story was true. She was then in a position to file an appeal of her claim. Having a claim rejected adds an emotional burden on top of the original trauma from having been removed from one's family.

== Similar social developments in other countries ==
In Australia, a similar policy removed Aboriginal and Torres Strait Islander children from their families and placed them in orphanages, children's homes, or with non-Aboriginal foster parents. These children are sometimes referred to as the Stolen Generations. Similar policies affected unmarried mothers of European descent.

In the United States, according to the National Indian Child Welfare Association (NICWA), 25 to 35 percent of Native children nationwide were being removed from their families in 1978. Overarching federal legislation setting standards for child custody proceedings, the Indian Child Welfare Act (ICWA), was adopted that year. ICWA mandates that if a Native American child's parent dies, exhaustive efforts must be made to reunite the child with the surviving parent or other relatives. Children are placed with non-Native families only when a Native foster home, preferably one within the child's tribe, cannot be found.

A similar term, Baby Scoop Era, refers to a period starting after the end of World War II and ending in 1972 that was characterized by an increased rate of premarital pregnancies, along with a higher rate of forced adoptions among the non-Indigenous population.

In the 1950s, there was another targeted removal of children from their families and communities in Canada. The children of a fringe group of Russian Doukhobors in British Columbia, called the Freedomites or Sons of Freedom, were taken by Canadian authorities.

== See also ==
- Canadian genocide of Indigenous peoples
- List of Indian residential schools in Canada
- Media portrayals of the Canadian Indian residential school system
- Residential school denialism
