= Edwin Kimelman =

Canadian judge

Edwin Charles Kimelman served as a judge of the Provincial Court of Manitoba Canada and authored a significant public report on child protection for aboriginal peoples.

== Career ==
Judge Kimelman received his call to the Manitoba bar in 1950 and began his career as a lawyer with the firm of Kopstein, Kimelman & Kopstein. In May 1975 he was appointed as a part-time judge of the Provincial Court of Manitoba. In July 1977 he was appointed a Senior Judge, and in November 1988 he was appointed Associate Chief Judge. He retired from the bench on July 1, 1999.

== Accomplishments ==
Judge Kimelman was well known for his work regarding the welfare of Aboriginal and Métis children. In the early 1980s, the Manitoba government established a Review Committee on Indian and Métis Adoptions and Placements, which was headed by Judge Kimelman. The committee's 1985 final report, entitled No Quiet Place was "a detailed list of horrors - an exhaustive compilation which concluded that the damage to Indian children had been real, frequent and widespread." Widely known in child welfare circles as the Kimelman Report, it had profound impact on aboriginal child protection in Canada and perhaps elsewhere.

== Community service ==
Judge Kimelman served on numerous community boards, including Jewish Child and Family Services, Sharon Home, Camp Massad, B'nai Brith, the United Way of Canada and the National Council of Juvenile and Family Court Judges.

Judge Kimelman died on September 2, 2007.
