= Foster Child (1987 film) =

- Directed by: Gil Cardinal
- Produced by: Jerry Krepakevich
- Cinematography: James Jeffrey
- Edited by: Alan Bibby
- Production company: National Film Board of Canada
- Release date: 1987
- Running time: 43 min 05 s
- Country: Canada
- Language: English

Foster Child is a 1987 documentary film by Gil Cardinal, exploring the filmmaker's search, at age thirty-five, for biological family. Cardinal often meets with frustration during his search, but eventually finds his natural family and discovers his Métis roots.

In Foster Child, Cardinal documents his discovery of his past, including the reasons why his birth mother gave him up for adoption when he was one year old, and sees photographs of his deceased biological mother for the first time. He learns in the film that she had died in 1974, after a long history of alcohol and poverty.

This National Film Board of Canada production received over 10 awards, including four Golden Sheaf Awards, a Special Jury Prize at the Banff Television Festival and a Gemini Award for best direction for a documentary program. It was broadcast on CBC's Man Alive series.

== See also ==
- Richard Cardinal: Cry from a Diary of a Métis Child
