= Aboriginal child protection =

Services designed for protection of the children of indigenous peoples

Aboriginal child protection describes services designed specifically for protection of the children of "aboriginal" or indigenous peoples, particularly where they are a minority within a country. This may differ at international, national, legal, cultural, social, professional and program levels from general or mainstream child protection services. Fundamental human rights are a source of many of the differences. Aboriginal child protection may be an integral or a distinct aspect of mainstream services or it may be exercised formally or informally by an aboriginal people itself. There has been controversy about systemic genocide in child protection systems enforced with aboriginal children in post-colonial societies.

== International ==
"In the second half of the twentieth century, removing children from their parents in order to change a people and a culture came to be recognized as an act of oppression, formally considered by the United Nations to be a form of genocide." Many distinct aspects of aboriginal child protection are thus related to international human rights law, including the 1951 Convention on the Prevention and Punishment of the Crime of Genocide, the 1976 International Covenant on Civil and Political Rights, and the 2007 United Nations Declaration on the Rights of Indigenous Peoples. The latter Declaration provides: "Indigenous peoples have the collective right to live in freedom, peace and security as distinct peoples and shall not be subjected to any act of genocide or any other act of violence, including forcibly removing children of the group to another group." It is non-binding but may be persuasive even for those states that voted against it. Within countries, the expression of aboriginal child protection may be seen to be entangled with issues relating to the right of self-determination of indigenous peoples.

== National ==
The domestic law of a country does not generally recognize an international law unless it is specifically introduced by the domestic law of that country. This may occur by express statutory provision or by a domestic court having regard to an international norm as reflecting social progress. Even without being specifically introduced into domestic law, international norms may have political effects especially in countries that actively espouse human rights. Aboriginal child protection issues tend to be prominent in countries colonized by a new majority population within the last few centuries. Assimilative policies arose, regardless of whether colonization proceeded mainly by force as in the United States of America and Australia or by treaty as in Canada and New Zealand. By the end of the twentieth century, assimilative policies were generally replaced in legislation, policy or practice by the Aboriginal Child Placement Principle which "outlines a preference for the placement of Aboriginal children with Aboriginal people when they are placed outside their families. The order of preference is generally that an Aboriginal child be placed: within the child’s extended family; or, if this is not possible, within the child’s Aboriginal community; and, failing that, with other Aboriginal people." Versions of this principle refashioned aboriginal child protection in Western post-colonial democracies along lines shaped by constitutional responsibilities: state in Australia, federal in the United States, federal/provincial in Canada and national in New Zealand, with constitutionalized Treaties playing a pivotal role in New Zealand and an emerging role in Canada.

=== Australia ===
In Australia, “Traditionally, the Aboriginal family was a collaboration of clans composed of mothers, fathers, uncles, aunties, brothers, sisters, cousins and so on. This size of family was the norm but is recognised in today's terms as an 'extended family'.” In 1983, a Family Court worker noted: "[T]he strength of family affiliation goes a long way to explain the preservation of a distinct culture that has defied assimilation despite aggressive government policies for over a century." Constitutionally, "The responsibility for legislating for children's welfare lies with each State and Territory Government in Australia." The Aboriginal Child Placement Principle was formulated in Australia in the late 1970s and 1980s. Different child welfare legislation in each state and territory make it difficult to determine the effectiveness of the principle. "[M]any Indigenous families prefer to make informal arrangements where possible for the care of children by extended family members. This distrust of the system is one of the reasons for the shortage of Indigenous carers in most jurisdictions in Australia." Recent studies have been carried out to see how partnerships can be used to fully understand the family structure in Aboriginal families and how to create partnerships to promote their wellbeing.

=== Canada ===
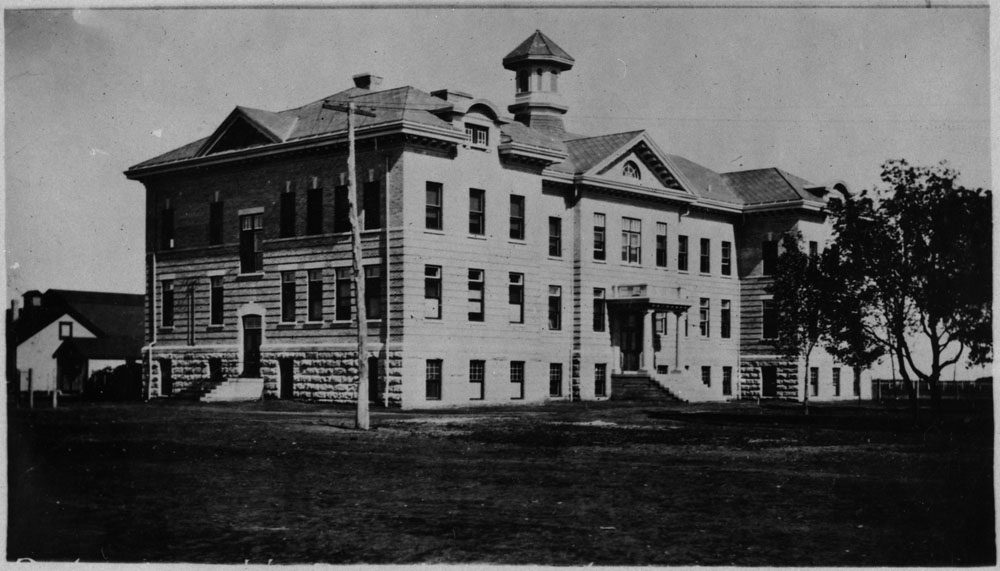
Residential school in Canada

Child protection for aboriginal peoples of Canada has tended from Confederation in 1867 to fall between the cracks. Constitutional arrangements in Canada assigned "Indians" to federal and child protection to provincial authorities. Several generations of family life for many aboriginal peoples were devastated by a policy designed to "kill the Indian in the child" effectuated through a compulsory residential school program. In the 1960s, many aboriginal children were forcibly removed from their families and adopted by non-aboriginal parents, in a process known as the "Sixties Scoop". In 1985, a Judge found that "Cultural genocide has been taking place in a systematic routine manner." During the 1980s, "First Nations peoples [took initiatives] in developing proposals of their own and in negotiating agreements with governments. ... First Nations peoples [developed] service models which reflect[ed] the experiences of their communities, cultures and histories." In 1982, aboriginal rights were protected in the Canadian Constitution. Developments in case law suggest that since 1982 aboriginal peoples' rights to cultural integrity have been constitutionally protected. Subsequently, some provinces enacted provisions and established policies for aboriginal child welfare agencies to provide services for aboriginal families on reserves under provincial law. They depend upon federal funding. "Native agencies are bound by the same provincial child-welfare laws as their mainstream counterparts, but must survive on far tighter budgets under a strict federal funding formula that takes little account of provincial legislation." In 2007, the Assembly of First Nations announced that it was filing a complaint with the Canadian Human Rights Commission that discriminatory services violated human rights. In 2008, Canada's Auditor General found that "Current funding practices do not lead to equitable funding among Aboriginal and First Nations communities." Currently, "The First Nations are engaged in a struggle to gain control of child welfare in their own communities, and this issue has a significant place in the First Nations movement towards self-determination." Indigenous peoples exercising the right of self-determination have yet to make it fully effective in respect of aboriginal child protection.

In 2017, the Innu Nation stated that there are 165 Labrador Innu children in foster care, 80 of whom are placed outside their home communities of Natuashish and Sheshatshiu. As of 2020, according to Innu Nation Grand Chief Gregory Rich, Natuashish and Sheshatshiu have a collective population of about 3,000 with about half of that being youths. Of that 167 of them are in the care of the Manager of Child and Youth Services.

In 2019, there were 150 Inuit children in the care of the Newfoundland and Labrador Department of Children, Seniors, and Social Development. An independent review, A Long Wait for Change, was completed by the province's Child and Youth Advocate at the request of the Nunatsiavut government and released in 2019. It contained 33 recommendations, including providing the support needed to transition to an Inuit-led child welfare system in Nunatsiavut.

The federal government passed Bill C-92, An Act Respecting First Nations, Inuit and Métis Children, Youth and Families in June 2019 coming into force on 1 January 2020. The new legislation creates national standards on how Indigenous children are to be treated. For example, when looking to place kids in foster care, authorities are to prioritize extended family and home communities. The law also allows Indigenous communities to create their own child welfare laws. Indigenous children make up seven per cent of Canada's population, but they represent about 50 per cent of youth in care.

On 18 June 2021, Nunatsiavut stated that it had begun the process of seeking devolution of child protection services from the Newfoundland and Labrador Department of Children, Seniors, and Social Development with the goal for negotiations to conclude within three years.

=== China ===
China has numerous indigenous peoples that are designated national ethnic minorities. China is undergoing extraordinarily rapid economic growth and urbanization from a recent baseline of extreme poverty. Provincial, county and township governments have difficulty financing social services. In these circumstances, "The majority of protective children are [those who are] abandoned and disabled. ... It is almost unimaginable that [a] child will be moved from the birthfamily due to child abuse and neglect by his or her birthparent(s)." A 2005 study sponsored by the All-China Women's Federation, UNICEF and Peking University and supported by the government of China found that child abuse is widespread in China. In the absence of state intervention to protect children within their families, aboriginal child protection tends to not be an issue. Ethnic minority families are exempted from the one-child policy, removing for ethnic minority populations one of the main reasons for child abandonment. In China, "Every ethnic group has the freedom to use its own spoken and written languages, and to retain or change its customs. ... [N]ational minorities exercise regional autonomy. Where national minorities live in compact communities autonomous organs of self-government are established…. The minority people … exercise autonomous rights, [are] masters in their own areas and administer the internal affairs of their ethnic group." "Recent reform efforts in China's child welfare practices have focused on the importance of providing safe, permanent families for children in lieu of long-term institutional care. Although challenges still exist, adoption and foster care are increasingly being seen as viable alternatives for these children." The combination of autonomous rights and absence of intrusive mainstream child protection services in China tends to defuse the principal driving forces underlying aboriginal child protection in other countries.

=== New Zealand ===
In New Zealand, social services established with the Child Welfare Act in 1925 "displayed little regard for the extended kin networks of Māori children." In 1955, New Zealand law retroactively abolished Māori customary adoptions. In 1982, a report recommended changes to the Department of Social Welfare to meet Māori needs. "The report's recommendations, all accepted by the then Minister, focus[ed] upon the need for the department to function in a bicultural manner and to share responsibility and authority for decisions with appropriate Māori people." By the late 1980s, "notions of social work accountability, along with the pivotal role accorded family and whanau, had tipped the balance of care and protection work away from professionals. 'Family solutions to family problems', an important philosophy of child welfare work for many years, became more significant as family decision-making assumed importance." In 1989, New Zealand Parliament passed the new ground-breaking Children, Young Persons, and Their Families Act 1989, based on a philosophy of kinship care, that recognized "the importance of cultural identity in child protection policy." "[K]inship care in New Zealand is ... an effort to redress past practices that harmed and alienated Māori children and families."

=== United States ===
Historically, in the United States "Indian tribes ... struggled against the assimilationist policies instituted by the United States which sought to destroy tribal cultures by removing Native American children from their tribes and families. In a stark example of such policies, the purpose articulated in the charter of the first boarding school in the 1890s on the Navajo reservation was 'to remove the Navajo child from the influence of his savage parents.'" In the 1960s, the federal government embarked on a new federal Indian policy of tribal self-determination. "In view of this new policy and the problems facing tribes as a result of the loss of their children, the Indian Child Welfare Act was enacted in 1978." Aboriginal child protection is now the subject of a body of federal law and programs. Through the Indian Health Service (IHS), the U.S. government provides "health services to more than 1.8 million Federally-recognized American Indians and Alaska Natives through a system of IHS, tribal, and urban ... operated facilities and programs based on treaties, judicial determinations, and Acts of Congress." The IHS is "the principal Federal health care provider and advocate for the health of American Indians and Alaska Natives". As part of its services, the IHS administers the Indian Child Abuse and Family Violence Prevention Act and with the Bureau of Indian Affairs offers model tribal laws for child protection codes on reservation. These services, programs and codes may be culturally and linguistically as well as legally and politically differentiated from those of State-based Child Protective Services but, more generally, "Kinship care has become an integral program option along the continuum of service options in the child welfare system."

== Laws ==
In a democracy child protection is subject to the rule of law. Many countries have written laws governing the exercise of state power for child protection. Indigenous peoples had organized societies and customary laws. Indigenous peoples' customary laws are recognized and enforceable as part of the laws of post-colonial countries. In the US, "Customary law still appears in many of the decisions of American state and federal courts. Customary law, part and parcel of the English common law adopted and adapted by the Founders of the United States, recurs less often given that statutory and administrative law dominate the field. In contrast, the importance of customary law in American Indian tribal courts cannot be [over]stated." In Canada, a court noted that "such rules, whether they result from custom, tradition, agreement, or some other decision making process, are 'laws' in the Dicey constitutional sense." Inevitably, political tensions over the exercise of self-determination by aboriginal peoples find expression in legal tensions between indigenous, customary laws and post-colonial statutes respecting child protection for aboriginal children. Indigenous legal principles that reflect a more holistic worldview, and so give relatively greater emphasis to spiritual, cultural and relational needs in addition to physical needs of the child, may add to the legal differences.

=== Defining "Aboriginal" ===
As aboriginal child protection returns to its roots among aboriginal peoples, the question of who is aboriginal becomes increasingly pertinent. Aboriginal customs and colonial statutes were the two main sources of legal definitions of aboriginality. Aboriginal peoples were typically cohesive, numbering only hundreds or perhaps thousands, and collectively knew who they were. Their customary self-definitions may have been cultural rather than racial because some interbreeding was important for healthy genetic diversity. Colonial statutes were generally based on race or place. Today, the challenges of definition span a range from New Zealand's with one officially recognized ethnic minority to China's with 55. In Australia and Canada, where for jurisdictional reasons child protection laws affecting aboriginal families vary across states and provinces, availability of aboriginal child protection services tends to be defined by place.

=== Australia ===
In Australia, "In his analysis of over 700 pieces of legislation, the legal historian John McCorquodale found no less than 67 different definitions of Aboriginal people." A study in Australia found various ways of defining well-being of indigenous children who are in care. One portion includes the importance of being connected to their roots and understanding the Indigenous code of conduct.

=== Canada ===
Three constitutionally undefined groups of aboriginal peoples have constitutional rights in Canada. Of these, only "Indians" are statutorily defined for administrative purposes and the statutory Band scheme does not correspond with Indian peoples. From its inception in 1876, the Indian Act established convoluted but essentially patrilineal definitions of "Indian", an exercise in gender discrimination that was eroded and finally eliminated by court decisions and statutory amendments in the 25 years following the 1982 Canadian Charter of Rights and Freedoms. In general, aboriginal peoples in Canada continue to have the right to define themselves for their own purposes and such definitions may have wider application. In 1999, Pimicikamak, a Canadian aboriginal people, enacted a citizenship law based on self-identification, acceptance by the people, and objective verifiability. In 2003, the Supreme Court of Canada prescribed three similar criteria for determining who is a member of a Métis people, reflecting the customary aboriginal definition (with the addition of objective verifiability, which was not an issue in the pre-colonial context).

=== China ===
In China, distinct ethnic groups have been officially defined since 1949. The criteria for recognition of an ethnic group are: a territory in China from which it originated, a distinct language, distinctive customs and a sense of collective identity.

=== New Zealand ===
"The Waitangi Tribunal was established in 1975 by the Treaty of Waitangi Act 1975. The Tribunal is a permanent commission of inquiry charged with making recommendations on claims brought by Māori relating to actions or omissions of the Crown that breach the promises made in the Treaty of Waitangi."
