= Ontario Highway 68 =

Former Ontario provincial highway

Highway 68
- Manitowaning Road
- The Highway 68 designation applied only to the portion of contemporary Highway 6 located on Manitoulin Island and northerly to McKerrow.

Route information
- Maintained by the Ministry of Transportation of Ontario
- Length: 116.8 km (72.6 mi) in 1980
- Existed: August 11, 1937–Spring 1980 (renumbered as extension of Highway 6)

Major junctions
- North end: Highway 17
- Highway 540 (Meredith Street) – Little Current; Highway 542 – Tehkummah
- South end: Ferry Dock in South Baymouth

Location
- Country: Canada
- Province: Ontario
- Counties: Sudbury, Manitoulin
- Major cities: McKerrow, Espanola, Little Current, Manitowaning, South Baymouth

Highway system
- Ontario provincial highways; Current; Former; 400-series
← Highway 67	→ Highway 69

King's Highway 68, commonly referred to as Highway 68, was a provincially maintained highway on Manitoulin Island, linking the island to the mainland. It was connected to the rest of the network at McKerrow, where it met Highway 17. The road was built in the 1920s as a trunk road for the Department of Northern Development (later merged into the Department of Highways, today's Ministry of Transportation), but was assumed as a provincial highway in 1937, as the only King's Highway on the island. Highway 68 stretched from South Baymouth in the south, through the towns of Manitowaning and Little Current north through Espanola on the mainland, before terminating at Highway 17 in McKerrow.

The entire route was later redesignated as an extension of Highway 6 in 1980. It remains part of the provincial highway system under its new designation.

== Route description ==
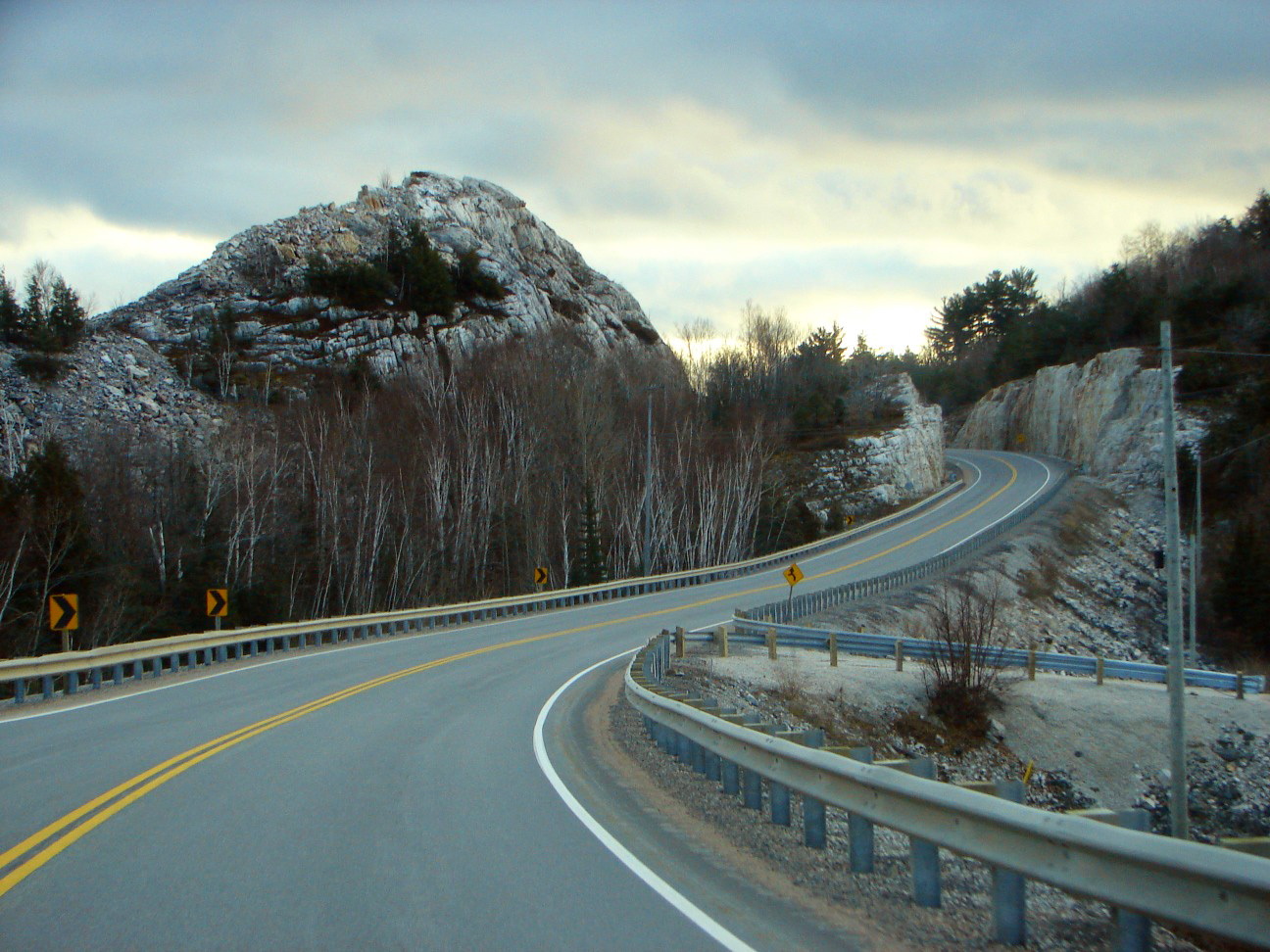
Highway 6 (originally 68) through the La Cloche Mountains near Whitefish Falls

Highway 68 was a 116.8 km (72.6 mi) route that crossed the eastern side of Manitoulin Island in a north–south orientation between South Baymouth and Little Current. North of there, it travelled through the La Cloche Mountains en route to Espanola and Highway 17. However, in 1980 the route was renumbered as a northern "extension" of Highway 6. The two segments of the highway are connected by the seasonal Chi-Cheemaun ferry service that travels between Tobermory and South Baymouth. This service only operates from May through October.

Today, the former routing is surrounded by farms and ranges outside of the numerous communities it interconnects on Manitoulin Island. On the mainland, the highway passes through mountainous terrain and the rugged Canadian Shield. Communities along the route include South Baymouth, Squirrel Town, Manitowaning, Sheguiandah, Little Current, McGregor Bay, Whitefish Falls, West River and Espanola.

== History ==
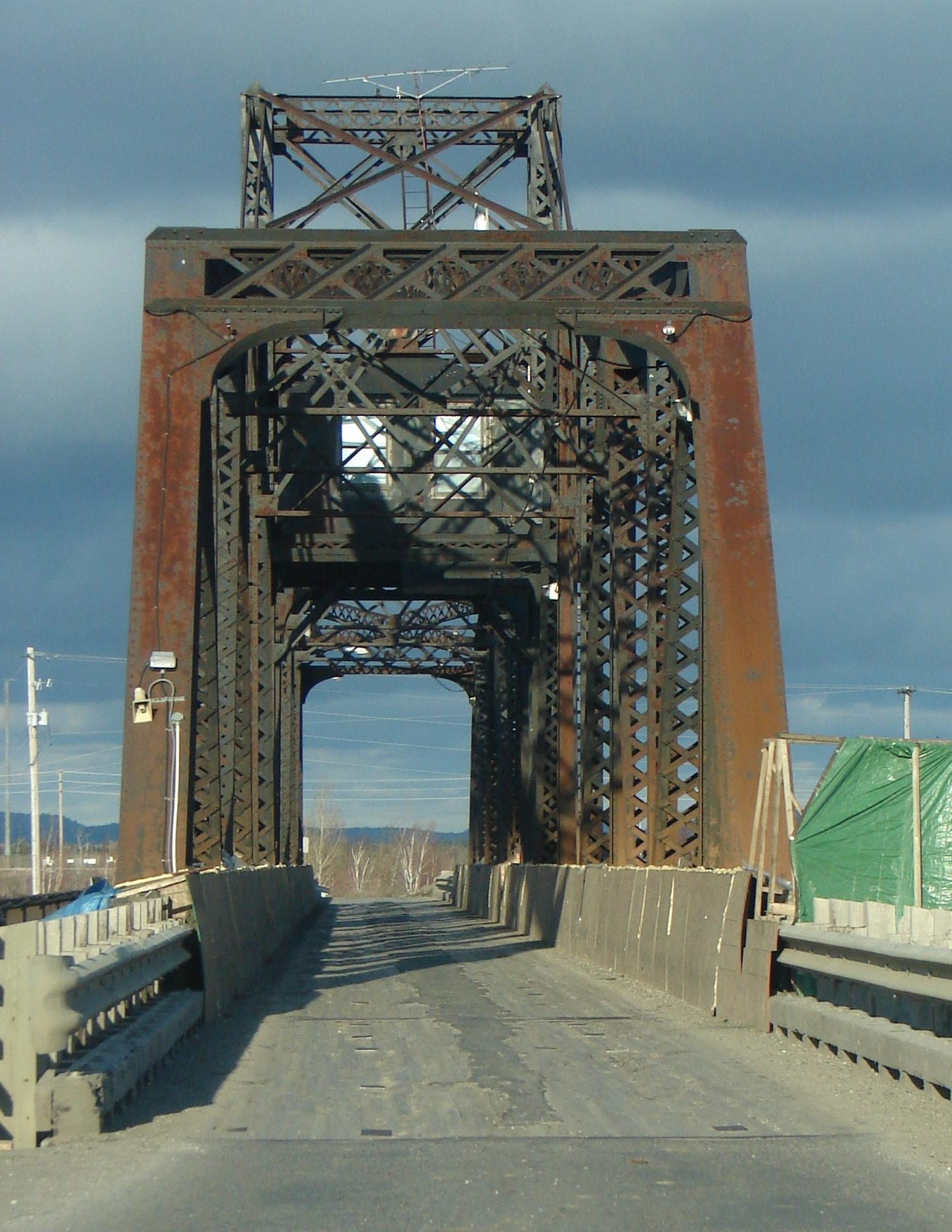
The Little Current Swing Bridge connects Manitoulin Island to the mainland.

The history of Highway 68 dates to 1929, when the Department of Northern Development (DND) constructed a 56 km (35 mi) gravel road between McKerrow and Goat Island. From there, a railway and ferry crossed the North Channel to Little Current on Manitoulin Island. On April 1, 1937, the DND merged into the Department of Highways (DHO), and the latter began to assume and number trunk roadways in central and northern Ontario. On August 11, 1937, the DHO took control of the Little Current Road. At its northern terminus, Highway 17 was rerouted in 1939, bypassing the old alignment between Webbwood and McKerrow. As a result, Highway 68 was extended north by 2 km (1.2 mi) to meet this new alignment.

During World War II, the rail bridge over the North Channel was abandoned, and subsequently redecked for highway use in 1945. Highway 68 was extended across the channel to Little Current, increasing its length by 1 km (0.62 mi). However, Manitoulin Island would still remain without a highway of its own until the mid-1950s. On December 7, 1955, the route was extended 41.5 mi (66.8 km) across the island to South Baymouth.

While the road was re-aligned somewhat throughout its history (many of the re-alignments took place in the late 1950s and early 1960s), and its overall path has not changed, its length has varied considerably during re-alignments, creeping as high as 130 km during the 1960s, before settling back down to its current value of around 116 km. Some former alignments (such as "Devil's Elbow Road") are still in use. The road was fully paved by 1973, making this road the second last Kings Highways in the province to be paved in its entirety (with the last being Highway 129).

During the spring of 1980, the entire length of Highway 68 was renumbered as part of Highway 6. The two discontinuous sections of Highway 6 are linked only by a privately operated ferry, MS Chi-Cheemaun, which crosses Georgian Bay daily from May to October between South Baymouth and Tobermory.

== Major intersections ==
The following table lists the major junctions along Highway 68, as noted by the Ministry of Transportation of Ontario.

Division	Location	km	mi	Destinations	Notes
Manitoulin	South Baymouth	0.0	0.0		Ferry Docks
Manitoulin	Tehkummah	12.9	8.0	Highway 542	
Manitoulin	Manitowaning	29.9	18.6	Manitowaning Road	
Manitoulin	Sheguiandah	54.3	33.7	Sheguiandah Bay Road	
Manitoulin	Little Current	63.9	39.7	Highway 540 west (Merideth Street)	
Manitoulin	Little Current	64.8	40.3	North Channel – Little Current Swing Bridge	
Sudbury	Espanola	108.7	67.5	Foster Drive	Beginning of Espanola Connecting Link agreement
Sudbury	Espanola	112.6	70.0	Second Avenue	
Sudbury	Espanola	114.1	70.9	Tudhope Street	End of Espanola Connecting Link agreement
Sudbury	Baldwin Township	116.8	72.6	Highway 17 – Sudbury, Massey	
1.000 mi = 1.609 km; 1.000 km = 0.621 mi
