= Little Current (disambiguation) =

Little Current may refer to:

- Little Current, Ontario
- Little Current (horse)

== See also ==
- Little Current Public School
- Little Current Swing Bridge
- Little Current Water Aerodrome
