= Algoma Eastern Railway =

Railway line and company in Ontario, Canada

- Maximal extent of the Algoma Eastern Railway, including spur lines.

Overview
- Headquarters: Turner, Ontario
- Reporting mark: AER
- Locale: Northeastern Ontario, Canada
- Dates of operation: 1911–1930
- Predecessor: Manitoulin and North Shore Railway
- Successor: CPR Little Current Subdivision; CPR Nickel Subdivision

Technical
- Track gauge: 4 ft 8 1/2 in (1,435 mm) standard gauge
- Length: 87 miles (140 km)

The Algoma Eastern Railway (reporting mark AER) was a railway in Northeastern Ontario, Canada. Originally known as the Manitoulin and North Shore Railway (M&NS) with a charter dating back to 1888, the full mainline was opened to traffic in 1913, serving the area along the north shore of Lake Huron between Sudbury and Little Current on Manitoulin Island. It and its sister railway, the Algoma Central, were originally owned by the Lake Superior Corporation, a conglomerate centered on Sault Ste. Marie which was founded by the American industrialist Francis Clergue. Despite ambitious plans to expand across Lake Huron to the Bruce Peninsula using a railcar ferry, the company failed to develop further and was acquired by the Canadian Pacific Railway in 1930. With freight traffic low during the Great Depression, Canadian Pacific soon abandoned much of the Algoma Eastern mainline in favor of its own Algoma Branch. Remaining sections of the Algoma Eastern line were turned into spurs, with the longest surviving section operated as a branch line known as the Little Current Subdivision.

Today only two short sections remain, which are used as industrial spurs. The railway's most notable surviving piece of infrastructure is the Little Current Swing Bridge, which crosses the North Channel of Lake Huron to connect Manitoulin Island with the mainland; as of 2021, it is used exclusively by road traffic, and is planned to be decommissioned.

== Traffic sources ==
The line had a traffic base focused on forestry products from the abundant forests on the north shore of Lake Huron such as pulp and paper and milled lumber, as well as the metal mining and smelting industries of the Sudbury Basin. Major traffic sources included the Canadian Copper Company's smelter at Clarabelle and a Canadian Copper Co. mine at Creighton. The Lake Superior Corporation had a nickel mine at Elsie and a nickel mine and smelter at Gertrude. The Spanish River Pulp & Paper Company had a pulp and paper mill at Espanola. The Haight & Dickson Lumber Company had a sawmill near Creighton and the Mond Nickel Company opened the North Star Mine near Creighton as well. Another Canadian Copper Co. mine was served at Crean Hill. A yard, offices, engine repair facility and deep water port was located at Turner, directly opposite Little Current on Goat Island.

== Lease by CPR ==
The Lake Superior Corporation entered financial difficulty during the Great Depression. In March 1930 the Canadian Pacific Railway (CPR) leased the AER for 999 years. The AER would be later dissolved in 1958, with its property vested in the CPR.

Under CPR management, the tracks of the AER were consolidated and merged into the CPR system. System rationalization eventually saw duplicate AER tracks between Sudbury and Espanola removed. AER tracks serving metal mining and smelting industries in the Sudbury area were maintained as spurs. The AER line from Espanola south to Turner and Little Current was renamed the Little Current Subdivision and remained active into the 1970s for transporting iron ore pellets to a ship loader at Turner for furtherance on lakers and coal from Turner to smelters in the Sudbury Basin.

By the 1980s, traffic on the Little Current Sub had entered decline as metal products were no longer being shipped by lakers from Turner. The 1913-era Little Current Swing Bridge built by the AER had been converted by CPR to a dual railway and road vehicle bridge in 1946; the 1980s traffic declines saw CPR eliminate rail service to Little Current and the bridge became exclusively a road vehicle bridge. During the 1990s the line between Espanola and Turner was downgraded by CPR to the Little Current Spur and eventually abandoned south of the pulp mill in Espanola.

Today, aside from remote sections of industrial track in the Sudbury area, the only remnant of the AER in operation is the 2.95 mi (4.75 km) Little Current Spur which runs from the former CPR mainline (now operated by the Huron Central Railway (reporting mark HCRY)) at McKerrow south to Espanola.

== Geography ==
The development of the Manitoulin and North Shore, or Algoma Eastern, was first and foremost guided by the presence and location of various natural resources along Lake Huron's North Shore, as well as the Sudbury Basin. American industrialist Francis Clergue had recently boosted the pulp and paper industry around Sault Ste. Marie, creating another market for the North Shore logging industry. The need for sulfuric acid in paper-making drove Clergue's interest in far eastern nickel-mining locations near Sudbury, which were quite distant from his Lake Superior Corporation's Sault Ste. Marie-based business empire. These far eastern properties, the Gertrude and Elsie mines, soon became important to the Lake Superior Corporation, and drove the demand for a rail link. Far from the original M&NS charter of a rail link connecting Manitoulin Island to the North Shore, Clergue's 1900 charter allowed for a Sudbury-to-Sault Ste. Marie rail connection, along with the original M&NS plan of a connection to Manitoulin.

When construction began in 1901, the builders, Fauquier Brothers, avoided cutting straight through the "ever-present" rock ridges of the western Sudbury area. Instead, sidehill construction was used, creating a meandering, indirect course. The muskeg and swamp areas of the right of way resulted in the need for a number of wooden trestles or use of gravel fill. The builders did make cuts through softer clay ridges, but used an absolute minimum of track ballast, inevitably causing the rails under the weight of trains to be submerged in mud during or after wet weather.

Around the same time, a then-unconnected section was constructed of what would ultimately be the Algoma Eastern line, from Stanley Junction (later McKerrow) south to what would become Espanola, through the hills north of the La Cloche Mountains and across the Spanish River. This spur was promptly leased to Canadian Pacific, as there was no way for Algoma Eastern to service it from its Sudbury yard without using Canadian Pacific's tracks.

Sluggishly, and after a number of financial and management setbacks with its parent company, the Lake Superior Corporation, the Manitoulin and North Shore Railway continued to push west from Sudbury throughout the late 1900s and early 1910s, maintaining its plans to build all the way to Sault Ste. Marie and to connect to its spur at Stanley Junction. From Turbine to Nairn, the M&NS line roughly paralleled the CPR line and ran on the south shore of the Spanish River, but was often no more than five or six feet above the river's summer level; in the opinion of rail historian Dale Wilson, "spring flood-waters must have been a chronic problem." At the same time, earlier sections of the line closer to Sudbury were improved with some draining of the muskeg lands and improvement of the line's infrastructure, which was not completely successful.

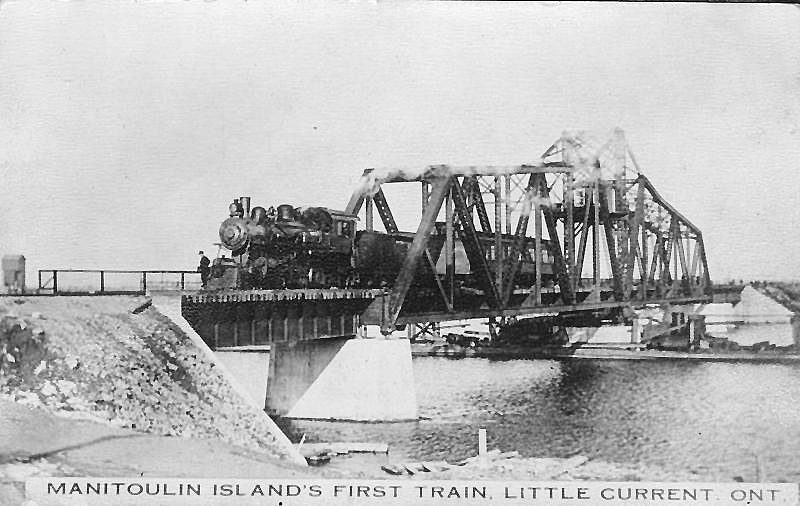
The first train to cross the Little Current Swing Bridge, hauled by Locomotive #51.

In April 1913, railway construction had carved its way through the La Cloche Mountains to Turner, which was across the North Channel from Little Current on Manitoulin Island, and which was the chosen location for dock facilities, as well as the railway's western yard. By October, the now-iconic Little Current Swing Bridge was open, allowing trains (and later, road vehicles) to cross the North Channel.

In the time after the construction of the railway, the area's environment would be slowly transformed. Hydroelectric power operations such as the INCO High Falls and Nairn Falls Dam and Generating Plant would help to slightly stabilize the seasonal flooding of the Spanish River through the creation of the Agnew Lake reservoir upstream. As well, the clay belts and muskeg west of Sudbury would always be challenging terrain, and as active and passive deforestation due to industrial operations at locations like O'Donnell devastated the environment in the area, it would become even more desolate, and less attractive to permanent human habitation. Today much of that area of the line, both active and disused, is relatively remote, and is still used for Vale Limited industrial operations.

== Rolling stock ==
Before its acquisition by Canadian Pacific, the Algoma Eastern Railway had a small but significant amount of steam-driven rolling stock, which serviced its passenger and freight operations. After Canadian Pacific took over its operations, the surviving rolling stock was used by Canadian Pacific alongside CP's own vehicles and equipment to service the line as it was gradually abandoned.

=== Locomotives ===
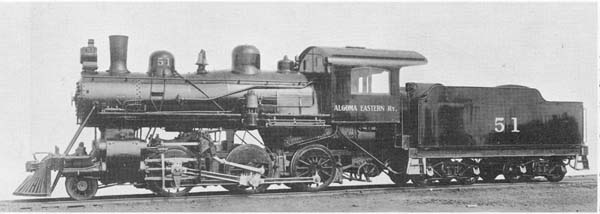
Locomotive #51, a 2-6-0 "Mogul".

Algoma Eastern's first locomotive, acquired during its M&NS days, was a 2-6-0 "Mogul" engine built by Montreal Locomotive Works (MLW #41092) in 1907. Originally designated as Algoma Central #27, it was transferred from its sister railway (Algoma Central) to Algoma Eastern and renumbered as Algoma Eastern #50. Another 2-6-0 engine followed in 1912, this time a brand new unit (MLW #51183) built in September of that year, which became Algoma Eastern #51. Both of these 2-6-0 locomotives were smaller and lighter than the 2-8-0 freight locomotives the company would later acquire, and were used for passenger service. They were also joined in 1912 by an older 4-6-0 locomotive, built by the Baldwin Locomotive Works (BLW #20272) in 1902, a type commonly used for express passenger service due to its capacity for sustained high speeds; it was designated Algoma Eastern #40.

After this, Algoma Eastern began to acquire a number of 2-8-0 "Consolidation" freight locomotives, which would complete the company's locomotive roster. The first, in February 1913, was Algoma Eastern #52 (or MLW #51182), which was capable of a higher tractive effort than any engine the company currently had. After the end of the First World War, several even more powerful locomotives were purchased: Algoma Eastern #53 and #54 (Canadian Locomotive Company #1351 and #1352) in 1916, and Algoma Eastern #55 and #56 in 1921. At least one other 2-8-0 locomotive, Algoma Eastern #58, was included in rosters, but was likely borrowed or leased from another railway.

Algoma Eastern's Official Railway Equipment Registers show an all-time peak locomotive roster of ten, in 1919–20, up from three in 1914/5; this would decline to eight thereafter and stabilize at that number until the end of the Algoma Eastern Railway Company in 1930.

Every documented Algoma Eastern locomotive is known to have been scrapped other than #58. #40 and #50 were scrapped in 1927, #51 in 1952, and the remainder were scrapped in 1955–57 during the height of the dieselization era.

=== Passenger cars ===
Algoma Eastern's passenger car roster was eclectic and poorly documented, with a sizable portion of it being transferred from the Algoma Central, and at least one car being purchased secondhand from an equipment dealer. The earliest known passenger car was a combine car, #201, which was transferred from Algoma Central in April 1911, and originally purchased from Fitshugh & Co. (an equipment dealer) in August 1900; it was possibly originally owned by the abortive Iron Range and Huron Bay Railroad in Michigan. In 1913, a dedicated passenger coach, #81 (second-class and smoking), was transferred from the Algoma Central, which had seating for 70–86 passengers, and was built in September 1912 by either Canadian Car and Foundry (CCF) or the Preston Car Company, and which was probably a rebuilt baggage car. At the other end of the spectrum were a pair of brand-new dedicated first-class passenger cars built by CCF in August 1912. With another pair of combines and a dedicated baggage car, this completed a roster of one baggage car, three combines (one of which was later converted to a second baggage car), and three coaches.

After the takeover by Canadian Pacific, the passenger cars were all retained (with the exception of the oldest combine, which had already been disposed of ten years before) and renumbered according to Canadian Pacific's own numbering scheme. The baggage car was the first to be scrapped, in 1941, and the last, the pair of first-class coaches, were scrapped at the CPR Angus Shops in 1958. No passenger cars are known to have survived to the present day.

=== Freight and other cars ===
As a railway which primarily hauled freight, the Algoma Eastern owned over 500 freight cars during its nearly twenty-year existence, though its freight roster was constantly fluctuating. This included boxcars, flatcars, gondolas, and ore cars. There were also several maintenance of way vehicles, as well as two cabooses. The majority of freight cars were flatcars (creating important logistical capacity for the timber industry), followed by boxcars and gondolas. The railway undertook a major rolling stock renewal in 1919–22, when many of its older freight cars were scrapped and new ones were purchased; this coincided with the purchase of its most powerful freight locomotives. Many cars were gradually scrapped or sold off throughout the 1920s–30s, especially as the Great Depression reduced freight volumes, and only a dramatically reduced number of freight cars survived to be transferred to the CPR.

== Infrastructure ==
=== Facilities ===
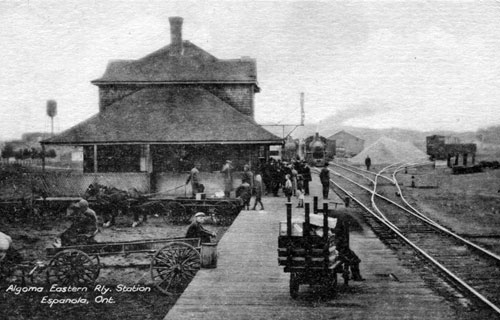
Espanola station c. 1923.

The Algoma Eastern Railway's infrastructure was built and dismantled by necessity and evolved over time, though by the railway's early-1920s heyday it had largely stabilized. After the railway's acquisition by Canadian Pacific, much of the infrastructure would be slowly removed, especially as the towns and industries it served declined. At the time of its 1930 lease to CP, it had seven full stations (at Copper Cliff, Creighton, Nairn, Espanola, Birch Island, McGregor Bay, and access to the shared CPR station in Sudbury), along with passenger shelters at many locations along the track. Previously, Algoma Eastern had also used the now-demolished Canadian National station located in Sudbury's Flour Mill district, and very early in its operations had picked up passengers at the Elm Street crossing where its tracks joined with Canadian Pacific's. After the end of passenger service, all of these stations were gradually demolished by CP Rail, some as late as the Espanola station in 1990. The sole known survivor is the Willisville passenger shelter, which was relocated to private property and is in use as a shed.

Also in 1930, the railway had seven section houses, a type of railway facility often used to temporarily house workers or to store supplies. These consisted of two in Creighton and one each in Mond, Drury, Espanola, Whitefish Falls, and Turner.

As a steam railway, the Algoma Eastern had a number of steam locomotive facilities such as engine houses at Sudbury and Turner; coal facilities at Sudbury, Turner, and Creighton; and water facilities at Sudbury, Turner, Crean Hill, Espanola, and Whitefish Falls. None of these facilities are known to have survived.

Coal was brought in via the coal dock at Turner Yard near Little Current. The yard had a steam-powered coal bridge and a stockpile area which was 700 feet (210 m) long and 250 feet (76 m) wide. This was lengthened to 1,100 feet (340 m) by 250 feet (76 m) in 1928. The coal bridge was removed in the 1960s.

=== Trackage ===
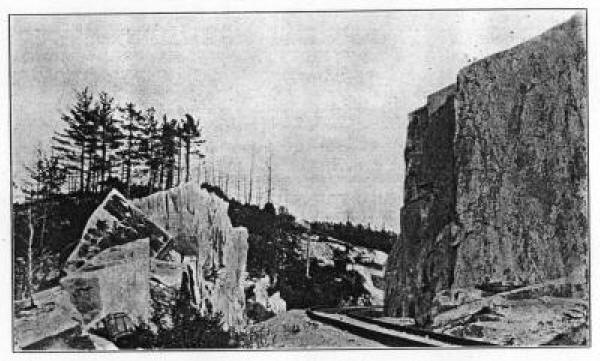
Construction of the mainline through a rock cut near Whitefish Falls in 1913.

The original rails used for Manitoulin and North Shore Railway tracks were 60-pound steel rails, which were laid from Sudbury for 14 miles up to Gertrude, with a three-track yard in Sudbury for train depot operations. By 1910, the M&NS had switched to using 80-pound rails.

A number of junctions and wyes existed along the Algoma Eastern during its history, as the railway facilitated bidirectional freight traffic from freight sources near the middle of the line, as well as rail-ship intermodal freight near the west end. The most famous of these is the Clara Belle or Clarabelle Junction near Copper Cliff, which is still in use today. This junction connected Algoma Eastern and Canadian Pacific tracks and allowed ore from mines like at Creighton to be moved eastward. Other junctions, such as Stanley junction (now McKerrow), grew up into small towns, in part due to the presence of significant industries nearby, or the advantages created by the presence of other rail lines. Elsie Junction, the location of one of the Algoma Eastern's earliest stations, faded from prominence after the First World War, in no small part due to the closure of the Elsie Mine, and was approximately replaced by Nickelton, the location of the British-American Nickel Company (BANC) smelter, which was near the Murray Mine. After the collapse of the BANC in 1924, the spur from Nickelton junction was abandoned, though it was later temporarily rebuilt to serve the Murray Mine again in 1940.

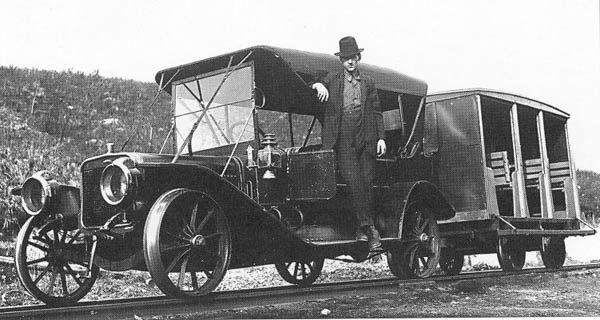
An Inco rail jitney believed to be in operation on the High Falls Spur, c. 1917.

While a number of potential junction points and interchanges with the Canadian Pacific were not used, such as at Crean Hill, others were set up further west. One of the more significant was at Turbine, where the Canadian Pacific and Algoma Eastern rights of way nearly overlapped, and an interchange was set up. A spur to the Huronian Power Company hydroelectric dam and adjacent village of High Falls, which was originally operated by Canadian Pacific, was given over to the Algoma Eastern, as Huronian's parent company, the Canadian Copper Company (later Inco) "favoured the [Algoma Eastern]'s competition." In 1938, with the Algoma Eastern in the process of being "rationalized" with the CP line, the railway spur was converted to a road.

At Nairn, built from scratch as a Canadian Pacific railway town, the Algoma Eastern also provided passenger service, and the Algoma Eastern and Canadian Pacific lines crossed each other at Algoma Eastern's mile 38 milepoint, just west of the town.

Further to the west, the Algoma Eastern had a stretch of track consisting of its station at Espanola, the Espanola rail bridge across the Spanish River, a north-south-east wye connecting to the rest of its mainline to the south and east, and to the north a short spur connecting it to the Canadian Pacific mainline at Stanley Junction. Over time Stanley Junction became known by several names, as in 1919 the CPR station there was renamed to Espanola station, despite this station being some distance from the town of Espanola, and the Algoma Eastern already operating an Espanola station. After Canadian Pacific's takeover of the Algoma Eastern, it then had ownership of two Espanola stations, so the Stanley Junction station was renamed again to McKerrow.

== See also ==
- Algoma Central Railway
- Huron Central Railway
- Canadian Pacific Railway
- Francis Clergue
- List of Ontario railways
- List of defunct Canadian railways
- History of rail transport in Canada
- Rail transport in Ontario
