= Haweater =

Term for a person born on Manitoulin Island, Ontario

Haweater is a designation given to a person born on Manitoulin Island, Ontario. The name derives from the prevalence of hawberries among the island's vegetation. Originally it was reported that early settlers got their vitamin C intake by eating hawberries, and thus avoided scurvy.

A person who has lived on Manitoulin Island, but was not born there, may be considered an honorary haweater.

== Culture ==
An annual cultural festival in Little Current is known as Haweater Weekend and takes place on the August Civic Holiday weekend. As well as concerts, sports, and recreational events, this festival is marked by the distribution of Haweater dollars, a community currency, and the production and sale of hawberry-flavoured products such as ice cream and jam.

A Haweater is also a one dollar commemorative coin minted for the island from 1969 to at least 2001. The coins depict various events and locations on the island.
