= O'Donnell, Ontario =

Ghost town in Greater Sudbury, Ontario

O'Donnell
- Ghost town
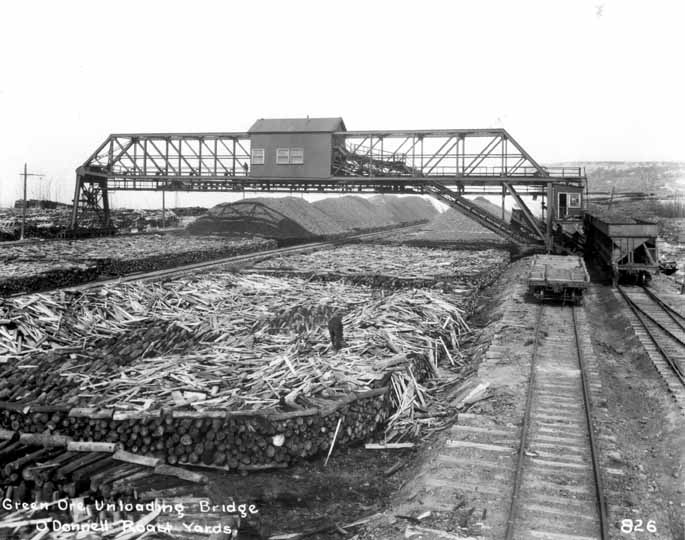
- Ore unloading bridge at O'Donnell c. 1916
- Interactive map of O'Donnell
- Country: Canada
- Province: Ontario
- District: Greater Sudbury
- Founded: 1915
- Abandoned: 1931
- Founder: Canadian Copper Company
- Time zone: UTC−5 (EST)
  - Summer (DST): UTC−4 (EDT)

O'Donnell is a ghost town and former industrial area in the city of Greater Sudbury, Ontario, Canada, which today is located on property owned by Vale Limited. It was located along the Algoma Eastern Railway line between two mine sites, Crean Hill and Gertrude. It functioned as a brief offshoot of the nearest major settlement along the line, the Inco company town of Copper Cliff, which today is a suburb of Sudbury.

== Origins and growth ==
In the 1910s, the landscape around Copper Cliff was dominated by large open-air roast yards. At the time, roasting was a labour-intensive activity which involved workers bringing ore to the yards in wheelbarrows, piling it, and manually spreading it before removing the roasted ore once again. This required a large workforce, and roasting activities were initially done close to the town. However, this process devastated large areas around the yards, and concerns began to increase about the long-term health implications of air pollution near roast yards, so the decision was made by the Canadian Copper Company to move its roast yards from Copper Cliff to a new site along the Algoma Eastern Railway (AER) line heading west.

The new roast yard location was established in 1915 and named after the man appointed to be its foreman, John O'Donnell. The yards themselves were laid out next to a spur line which extended to the south from the AER main line, and which also featured a loading area for the ore. A town site, which also fell to the south of the AER main line, was laid out to the north of the roast yards. With an estimated workforce of 200 men at the site, the town was planned for a population of approximately 600 inhabitants. It was laid out along four streets: Foley, Savage, Vermillion, and Ellis, with Vermillion and Ellis functioning as the main streets running southwest, perpendicular to the AER. Most of Savage and Foley Streets never saw permanent housing, and instead were used to park boxcars that functioned as overflow housing. The town did, however, have a few amenities, including a post office, club house, general store, school, town hall, jail, hockey rink, baseball field, and ice house. Vermillion and Ellis streets contained permanent housing of ten duplexes and ten detached dwellings, along with apartments above the two-storey general store, and were also serviced with sewer and water; the entire town also featured electric power.

== Decline and abandonment ==
The town's growth was tempered in 1918 when the workforce requirements were reduced to 40 men due to the construction of an ore bridge, and the actual population hovered around 100. The overflow housing was removed around this time. In 1921, the yards were temporarily shut down due to reductions in Inco's nickel production, and the entire population was removed. In the following year of 1922, the yards reopened and the town was re-inhabited. The new owner of the general store, Sam Fera, used a jitney to transport goods and passengers to and from Creighton Mine.

This revival was to be short-lived, however. Despite Inco's efforts to mitigate the issue, the environmental problems of open-air roast beds were clear and by 1929 the Canadian government began to take steps toward shutting them down. In 1930, Inco constructed a new roasting plant in Copper Cliff and ceased operations at O'Donnell. The majority of the workforce was removed for the second and final time, though cleanup operations continued until 1931 with a handful of workers remaining. Around this time, the struggling Algoma Eastern Railway was acquired by the Canadian Pacific Railway, and the CPR's consolidation of its rail lines around Sudbury led to the redundant sections (mostly of the AER) being abandoned as an active freight railway, though Inco continued to use sections of the rail line privately as a part of its mining operations. This, combined with the decline and abandonment of other nearby settlements and mining operations, ensured that O'Donnell swiftly fell into obscurity.

== Current status ==
Today, the former town site is largely overgrown and nothing remains of the buildings other than foundations. The roast bed, however, can be seen in satellite images, and in 2012 the City of Greater Sudbury pushed to have it designated as a UNESCO World Heritage Site to serve as a reminder of the catastrophic long-term consequences of industrial pollution and to commemorate the struggle of the people of Sudbury for environmental justice from mining companies, as well as the pioneering environmental reclamation work which began in the area in the 1970s.
