= Goat Island (Ontario) =

Island in Ontario, Canada

Coordinates: 45.9842°N 81.913397°W

Goat Island is a small island in the Canadian province of Ontario, located in the town of Northeastern Manitoulin and the Islands in the Manitoulin District.

== Transportation ==
Highway 6 passes through the island, crossing from Manitoulin Island via the Little Current Swing Bridge. Built in 1913 as a railway bridge, it has carried road traffic since 1946.

At the other end of the island, a fixed bridge carries the highway to Great La Cloche Island. The only other road on the island, Goat Island Road, is a service road that circles around the west end of the island. Goat Island Road has a cul de sac that ends on the northwest corner of the island, separated by a narrow section of the North Channel from a dirt trail leading off from Highway 6 on Great La Cloche Island. The former Highway 6 crossing was cut off after the roadway was re-aligned to the east end of the island in 1998.

== Communities ==
The only community located on the island is Turner. A small tank farm is used by E. B. Eddy to store chemicals for their Espanola, Ontario plant. Goat Island Range, a golf driving range, is the only business of the island.

There are two transformer stations found off Goat Island Road and Highway 6.
