= Baldwin, Ontario =

Baldwin
- Township (single-tier)
- Township of Baldwin
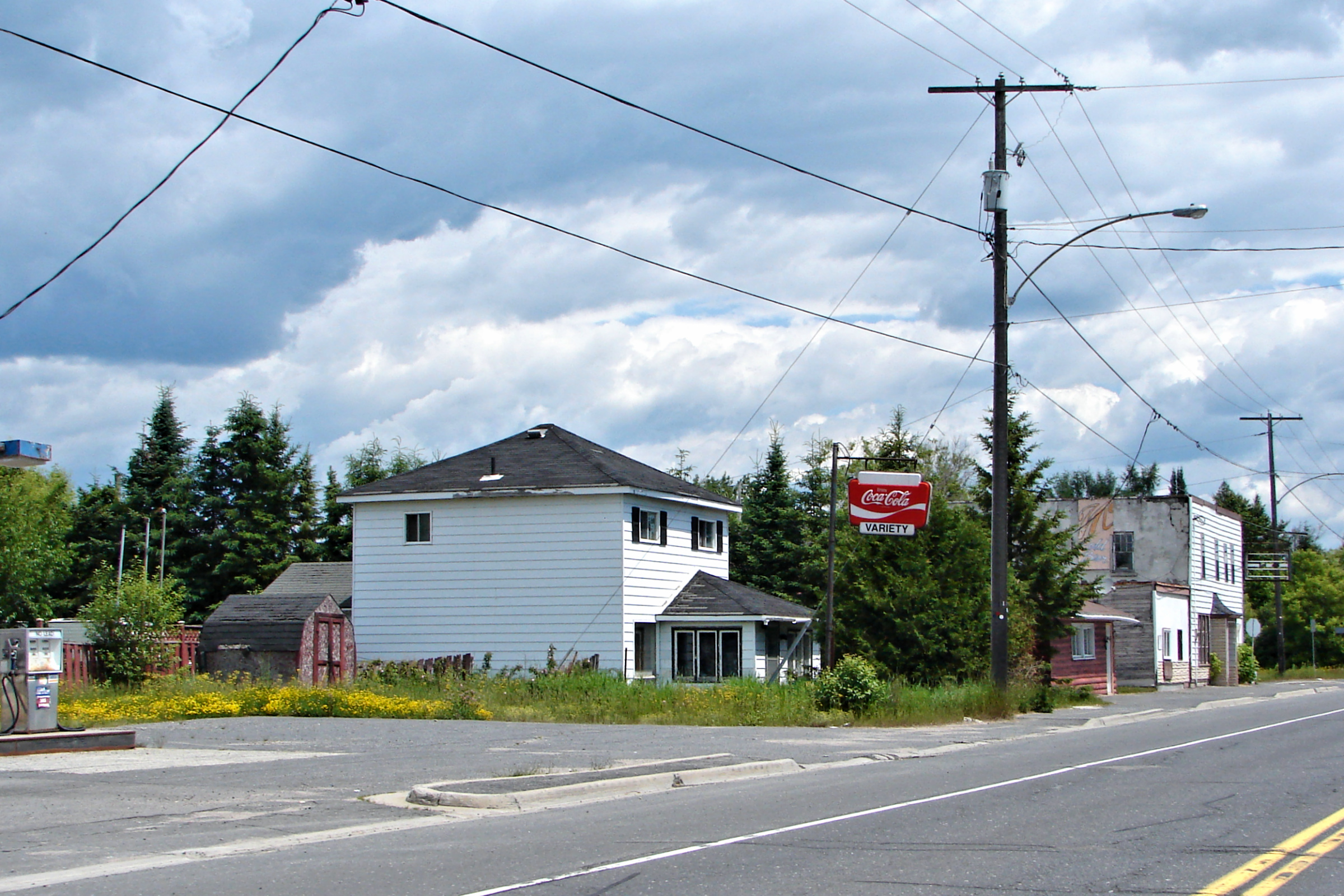
- McKerrow along Ontario Highway 17

- Location within Ontario
- Coordinates: 46°19′N 81°45′W
- Country: Canada
- Province: Ontario
- District: Sudbury
- Incorporated: 1927

Government
  - Reeve: Vern Gorham
  - Federal riding: Sudbury East—Manitoulin—Nickel Belt
  - Prov. riding: Algoma—Manitoulin

Area
  - Land: 82.49 km^{2} (31.85 sq mi)

Population (2021)
  - Total: 579
  - Density: 7/km^{2} (18/sq mi)
- Time zone: UTC-5 (EST)
  - Summer (DST): UTC-4 (EDT)
- Postal Code: P0P 1M0
- Area codes: 705 and 249
- Highways: Highway 17 / TCH; Highway 6
- Website: baldwin.ca

Baldwin is a township in the Canadian province of Ontario. Located in Sudbury District north of Espanola, the township's two main communities and population centres are McKerrow and Lorne. Baldwin had a population of 579 as of the 2021 Canadian census.

The junction of Ontario Highway 17 and Ontario Highway 6 is in Baldwin, just west of McKerrow.

An old abandoned fire tower still stands north of McKerrow on Agnew Lake.

The township is part of the federal riding of Sudbury East—Manitoulin—Nickel Belt (MP Jim Belanger) and the provincial riding of Algoma—Manitoulin (MPP Bill Rosenberg).

== History ==
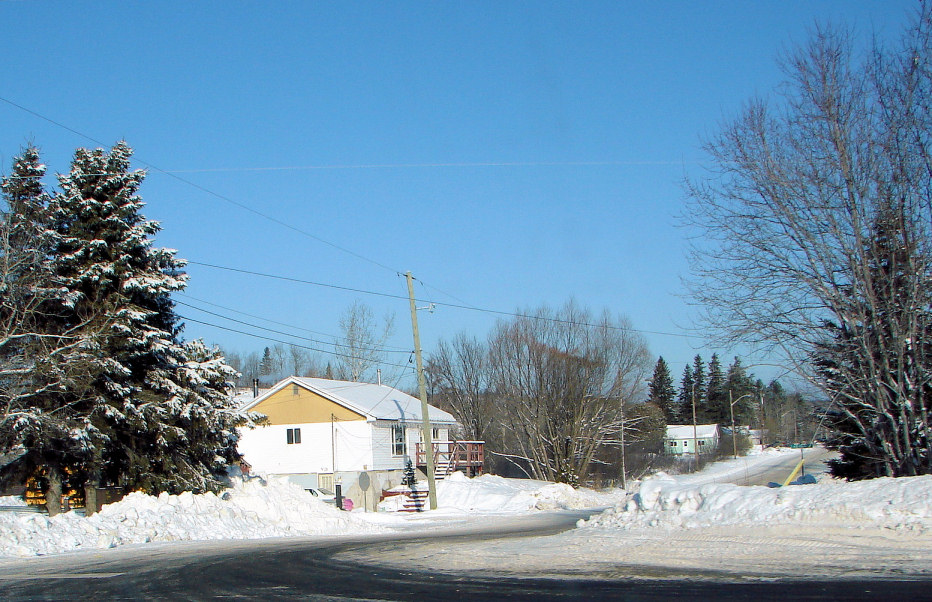
Residential side street in McKerrow

The township of Baldwin was surveyed in 1871 and subdivided in 1885, and was named after F. A. Baldwin.

In 1901, the Spanish River Pulp and Paper Company was planning a mill town nearby which would become the modern-day town of Espanola. It situated the mill site next to the Spanish River, which fell to the south of the Canadian Pacific Railway's Sault Ste. Marie branch or "Soo Line", with the portion of the line west of Webbwood being a part of its Webbwood Subdivision. Therefore, a decision was made to build a spur line which would connect Espanola with the CPR, and ultimately the CPR with the Algoma Eastern Railway, which was routed through Espanola parallel to the CPR line. The place where this spur joined with the CPR was initially named Stanley Junction in 1908, then changed to Espanola Station in 1919. The name was then changed again to McKerrow in 1931, after Jack O. McKerrow, a manager at the Abitibi Pulp and Paper Company. The population slowly grew, and Baldwin was officially incorporated as a township in 1927.

Throughout its history, McKerrow would continue to function as a minor hub for the CPR, befitting its status as a junction connecting the Canadian Pacific Little Current and Webbwood Subdivisions within the Sudbury Division of the Algoma District. Throughout the mid-20th century, however, passenger service at the station slowly decreased; in 1943, there were two trains per day per direction, with one route going west to Sault Ste. Marie and another south to Little Current, but by 1970, the Little Current route had been cut, leaving McKerrow with a single eastbound and single westbound train per day. In 1976, passenger service to McKerrow was eliminated altogether and never restored. In the 1980s, the town's historic two-storey station was demolished, though a shed from the original station was moved and is now privately owned and preserved. Today, the CPR has some maintenance sheds at McKerrow and occasionally uses it as a location for crew changes.

The main historic building in the community was the McKerrow Hotel or McKerrow Tavern, which originally opened in 1910 as a typical railway station hotel. Over several decades it gradually expanded, with multiple outbuildings built next to it and the original building being enlarged. At various times it functioned as a hotel, bar, coffee shop, and roadside restaurant, but was vacant for a number of years and began to decay. With the decline in train ridership and the rise of highway-based travel in the latter half of the 20th century, several new businesses were opened closer to the junction point of Highway 6 and Highway 17, which many car-based travelers pass through on their way to Espanola and Manitoulin Island. The 110-year-old hotel was demolished in 2020 after being vacant for around a decade.

== Demographics ==
In the 2021 Census of Population conducted by Statistics Canada, Baldwin had a population of 579 living in 238 of its 326 total private dwellings, a change of −4.3% from its 2016 population of 605. With a land area of 82.49 km^{2} (31.85 sq mi), it had a population density of 7.0/km^{2} (18.2/sq mi) in 2021.

Historical census populations – Baldwin, Ontario

Year	Pop.	±%
1921	320	—
1931	283	−11.6%
1941	252	−11.0%
1951	341	+35.3%
1956	417	+22.3%
1961	505	+21.1%

Year	Pop.	±%
1966	494	−2.2%
1971	612	+23.9%
1976	665	+8.7%
1981	690	+3.8%
1986	652	−5.5%
1991	692	+6.1%

Year	Pop.	±%
1996	694	+0.3%
2001	624	−10.1%
2006	554	−11.2%
2011	551	−0.5%
2016	605	+9.8%
2021	579	−4.3%

2016 Population figure based on revised count.
Source: Statistics Canada

== See also ==
- List of townships in Ontario
- List of francophone communities in Ontario
