= Northeastern Manitoulin and the Islands =

- Town (single-tier)
- Town of Northeastern Manitoulin and the Islands
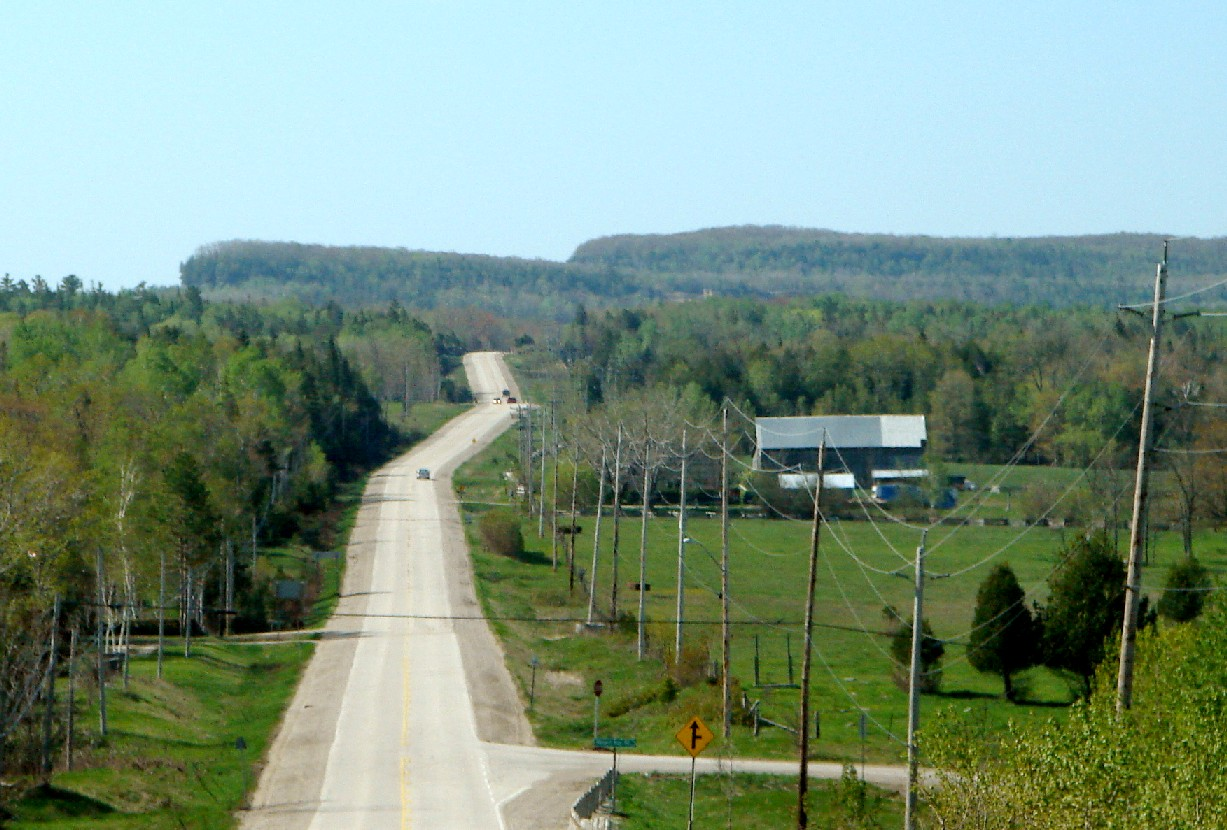

- Location within Manitoulin District Location within Ontario
- Coordinates: 45°58′N 81°56′W
- Country: Canada
- Province: Ontario
- District: Manitoulin
- Established: January 1, 1998

Government
  - Type: Town
  - Mayor: Alan MacNevin
  - MP: Jim Belanger (Conservative)
  - MPP: Bill Rosenberg (PC)

Area
  - Land: 489.19 km^{2} (188.88 sq mi)

Population (2021)
  - Total: 2,641
  - Density: 5.4/km^{2} (14/sq mi)
- Time zone: UTC-5 (EST)
  - Summer (DST): UTC-4 (EDT)
- Postal code: P0P 1K0
- Area code: 705
- Highways: Highway 6 Highway 540
- Website: www.townofnemi.on.ca

Northeastern Manitoulin and the Islands is a municipality with town status in Manitoulin District in Northeastern Ontario, Canada, approximately 30 kilometres (19 mi) south of Espanola. Its main town is Little Current, located on the northeast side of Manitoulin Island. However, its territory also includes most of the small islands surrounding Manitoulin, even those at the far western end of Manitoulin.

The town was created on January 1, 1998, by amalgamating the Town of Little Current with the Township of Howland and the unorganized small islands in Lake Huron.

It is the administrative headquarters of the Aundeck Omni Kaning First Nations band government.

== Geography ==
=== Communities ===
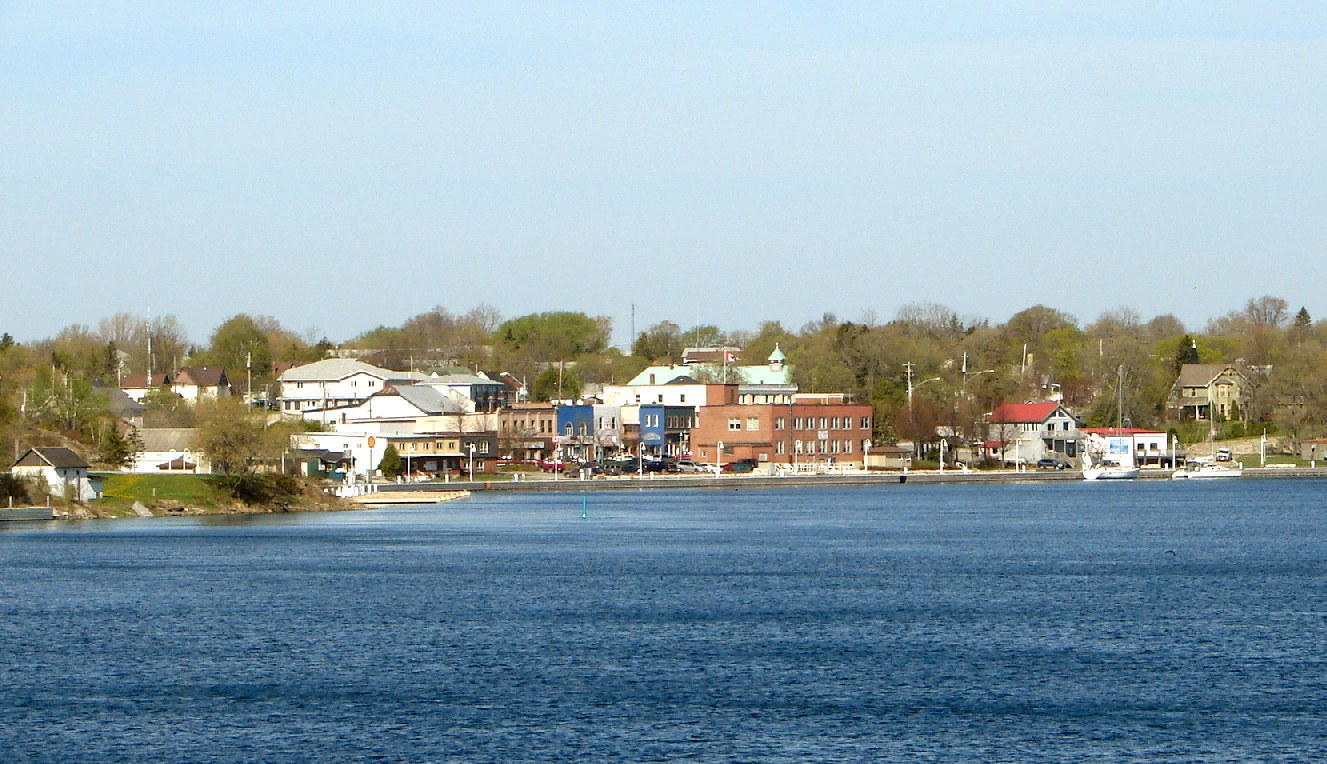
Little Current as seen across the North Channel

Little Current is the largest community within the town, as well as its administrative centre. Formerly an independent town, Little Current was named variously by different groups for the swift strong currents of water running between the narrow passageway which connects the North Channel and Georgian Bay. Past names for the community included Wewebijiwang/Wyabegwong, Le Petit Courant, and Shaftesbury.

The town also includes the smaller communities of Cold Springs, Dinner Point Depot, Eads Bush, Green Bay, Honora, Rockville, and Sheguiandah.

=== Climate ===
The climate is characterized by warm, humid summers (sometimes rainy/cooler) and snowy, rigorous winters. The cold season does not have many differences with other North American places of the same parallel. However, the obvious differing factor is that all weather is dictated by Lake Huron. As such, the lake generates microclimates similar to coastal cities, thousands of miles away; one example is Asahikawa, on the northern Japanese island of Hokkaido.

Climate data for Little Current, 1981-2010 normals
Month	Jan	Feb	Mar	Apr	May	Jun	Jul	Aug	Sep	Oct	Nov	Dec	Year
Record high °C (°F)	8 (46)	10 (50)	19 (66)	27 (81)	29 (84)	33 (91)	36 (97)	36 (97)	31 (88)	23 (73)	18 (64)	13 (55)	36 (97)
Mean daily maximum °C (°F)	−5.9 (21.4)	−3.8 (25.2)	1.5 (34.7)	10.3 (50.5)	17.7 (63.9)	22.5 (72.5)	25.1 (77.2)	24.1 (75.4)	18.7 (65.7)	11.7 (53.1)	3.6 (38.5)	−2.9 (26.8)	10.2 (50.4)
Mean daily minimum °C (°F)	−16.7 (1.9)	−15.6 (3.9)	−10.5 (13.1)	−1.5 (29.3)	4.0 (39.2)	8.9 (48.0)	11.9 (53.4)	11.0 (51.8)	7.0 (44.6)	1.9 (35.4)	−4.1 (24.6)	−11.9 (10.6)	−1.3 (29.7)
Record low °C (°F)	−41 (−42)	−41 (−42)	−32 (−26)	−15 (5)	−5 (23)	−1 (30)	2 (36)	0 (32)	−7 (19)	−8 (18)	−29 (−20)	−38 (−36)	−41 (−42)
Source: Environment Canada, The Weather Network

== Demographics ==
In the 2021 Census of Population conducted by Statistics Canada, Northeastern Manitoulin and the Islands had a population of 2,641 living in 1,205 of its 1,903 total private dwellings, a change of −2.6% from its 2016 population of 2,712. With a land area of 489.19 km^{2} (188.88 sq mi), it had a population density of 5.4/km^{2} (14.0/sq mi) in 2021.

Canada census – Northeastern Manitoulin and the Islands community profile

	2021	2016	2011
Population	2,641 (-2.6% from 2016)	2,712 (+0.2% from 2011)	2706 (-0.2% from 2006)
Land area	489.19 km^{2} (188.88 sq mi)	496.09 km^{2} (191.54 sq mi)	495.68 km^{2} (191.38 sq mi)
Population density	5.4/km^{2} (14/sq mi)	5.5/km^{2} (14/sq mi)	5.5/km^{2} (14/sq mi)
Median age	55.6 (M: 55.6, F: 56)	53.7 (M: 52.5, F: 54.6)
Private dwellings	1,903 (total) 1,205 (occupied)	2,313 (total) 1,182 (occupied)	2029 (total)
Median household income	$75,500	$60,288

References: 2021 2016 2011

Historical census populations – Northeastern Manitoulin and the Islands
Year	Pop.	±%
2001	2,531	—
2006	2,711	+7.1%
2011	2,706	−0.2%
2016	2,712	+0.2%
2021	2,641	−2.6%
Source: Statistics Canada

== Economy ==
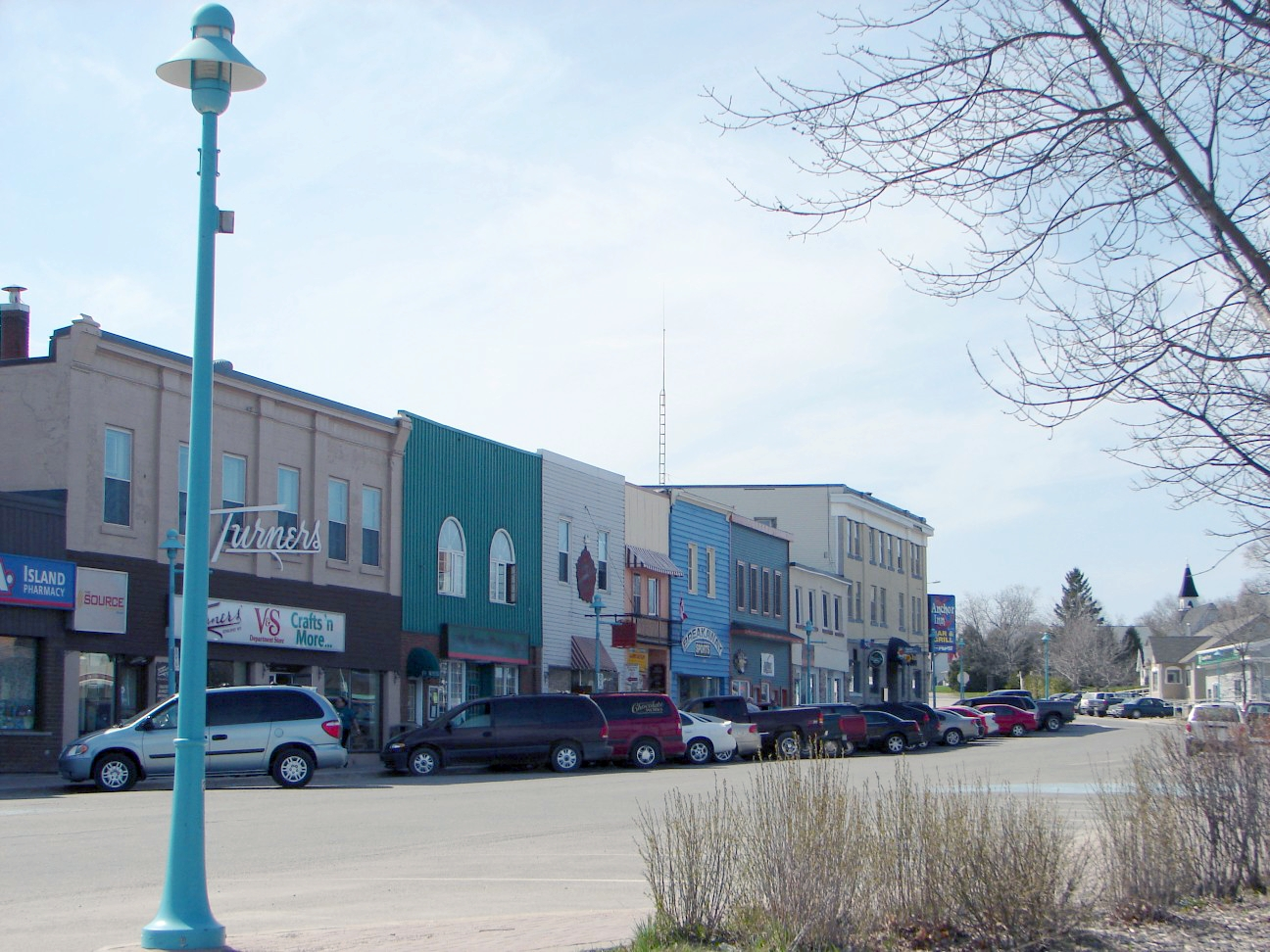
Water Street in Little Current

In the late 19th century lake vessels stopped here to take on wood for fuel. A settlement developed, with George Abotossaway, an Anishinaabe man, selling fuel to the steamers. The westbound passengers on board the vessels were usually from Upper Canada. One group included the Turner family which disembarked and, being merchants, set up a general store still in business today.

The lumbering trade was foremost in the region at the time and saw mills were established at nearby Low Island, now a park in the community. Settlers cleared the land for farming.

Today the local economy continues to include farming and lumbering but tourism is a main aspect.

== Transportation ==
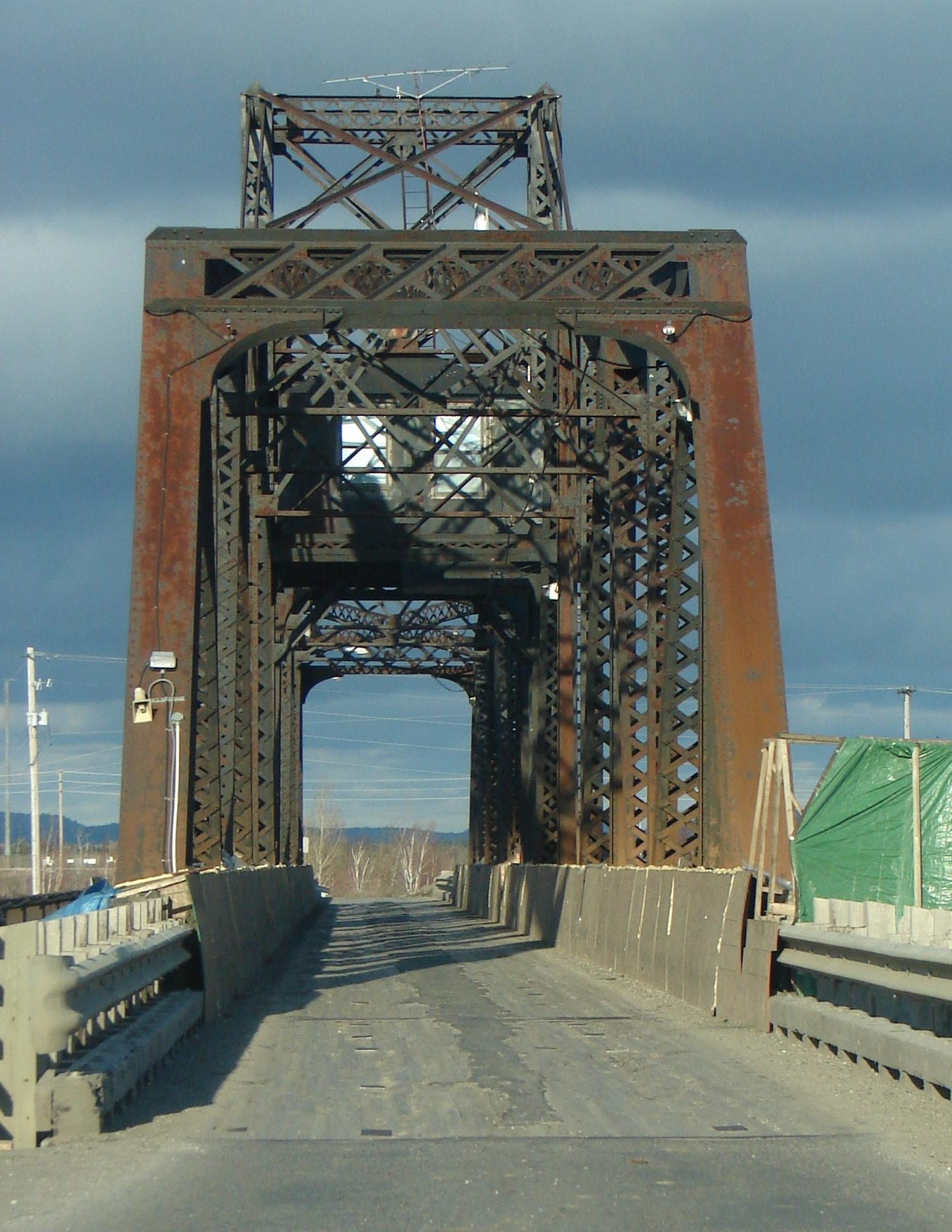
Little Current Swing Bridge

Being a safe haven from the ravages of Lake Huron, the community may be found on Canadian Hydrographic Chart #2205. It is well marked from the east by Strawberry Island Lighthouse and from the west by a series of navigational markers.

The only land access to Manitoulin is the Little Current Swing Bridge, located on Highway 6, crossing the North Channel of Lake Huron to the mainland, where the highway continues northward to Espanola. In summer the swing bridge opens to marine traffic on the hour for 15 minutes from sunrise to sunset, delaying road traffic.

Historically, Little Current was the western terminus of the Algoma Eastern Railway before the AER's acquisition by the Canadian Pacific Railway. After acquisition, the portion from McKerrow to Little Current was designated as the Little Current subdivision of the CPR, and became a spur of its Sault Ste. Marie line. Passenger rail ridership through Espanola and Little Current continued for some time due to the relatively difficult road access to the island, but passenger operations along the spur ended in 1963, and the line became an infrequently-used "ghost railway". Over the following decades, the CPR gradually removed sections of the track: in the 1980s, the section connecting Goat Island to Manitoulin Island across the Little Current Swing Bridge (which was converted to service road traffic only), and in the 1990s, the section connecting Espanola to Goat Island. Currently only a small portion of the track still exists, which connects the Domtar pulp and paper mill in Espanola to the CPR line using the junction at McKerrow; this stretch of track is the only surviving remnant of the AER.

In April 2018, Ontario Northland announced that it would begin bus service on Manitoulin Island, with buses stopping at Little Current upon arrival from Sudbury before travelling around the island using a circular route. The new route also includes Sheguiandah. This new route marked the first time the island had seen bus service in decades. Manitoulin Island service ended in 2019.

== Media ==
=== Radio ===
The town has two radio stations, CFRM and CHAW. Some radio stations from Sudbury can also be heard in the area, as can Elliot Lake's CKNR.

Frequency	Call sign	Branding	Format	Owner	Notes
FM 94.1	CKNR-FM	Moose FM	Adult contemporary	Vista Broadcast Group	
FM 97.5	CBCE-FM	CBC Radio One	Talk radio, public radio	Canadian Broadcasting Corporation	Rebroadcaster of CBCS-FM Sudbury
FM 100.7	CFRM-FM	Hits 100	Community radio/adult hits	Manitoulin Radio Communication	
FM 102.1	CJTK-FM-2	KFM	Christian music	Harvest Ministries Sudbury	Rebroadcaster of CJTK-FM Sudbury
FM 103.1	CHAW-FM	Country 103	Country music	Manitoulin Radio Communication	

=== Newspaper ===
The town's primary community newspaper is the weekly Manitoulin Expositor, which is the oldest still-extant newspaper in Northern Ontario.

== See also ==
- List of francophone communities in Ontario
- List of townships in Ontario
