= Ontario Highway 6 =

Ontario provincial highway

Highway 6
- Garafraxa Road
- A map of Highway 6

Route information
- Maintained by Ministry of Transportation of Ontario
- Length: 472.4 km (293.5 mi)
- Existed: June 1920–present

Major junctions
- South end: St. Patrick Street in Port Dover
- Highway 3 – Jarvis; Highway 403 – Ancaster; Highway 401 – Morriston; Highway 7 – Guelph; Highway 89 – Mount Forest; Highway 10 – Chatsworth; Highway 21 / Highway 26 – Owen Sound
- North end: Highway 17 / TCH – McKerrow

Location
- Country: Canada
- Province: Ontario
- Major cities: Hamilton, Guelph, Owen Sound
- Towns: Port Dover, Jarvis, Hagersville, Caledonia, Ancaster, Aberfoyle, Fergus, Arthur, Mount Forest, Durham, Chatsworth, Shallow Lake, Wiarton, Tobermory, Little Current, Espanola

Highway system
- Ontario provincial highways; Current; Former; 400-series
← Highway 5	→ Highway 7

King's Highway 6, commonly referred to as Highway 6, is a provincially maintained highway in the Canadian province of Ontario. It crosses a distance of 480 km (300 mi) between Port Dover, on the northern shore of Lake Erie, and Espanola, on the northern shore of Lake Huron, before ending at the Trans-Canada Highway (Highway 17) in McKerrow.

Highway 6 was one of several routes established when Ontario first introduced a highway network on February 26, 1920, following several pioneer wagon trails. The original designation, not numbered until 1925, connected Port Dover with Owen Sound via Hamilton and Guelph. When the Department of Highways (DHO) took over the Department of Northern Development (DND) in 1937, Highway 6 was extended north through the Bruce Peninsula to Tobermory. In 1980, the entire length of Highway 68 on Manitoulin Island and north to Highway 17 became a northern extension of Highway 6. Small modifications were made to the route of Highway 6 in 1997, but it was largely untouched by provincial downloading.

Highway 6 is one of two highways in Ontario (the other being Highway 33) broken into two segments by a ferry. The Chi-Cheemaun ferry serves automobile traffic, connecting Tobermory with South Baymouth between May and October.

== Route description ==
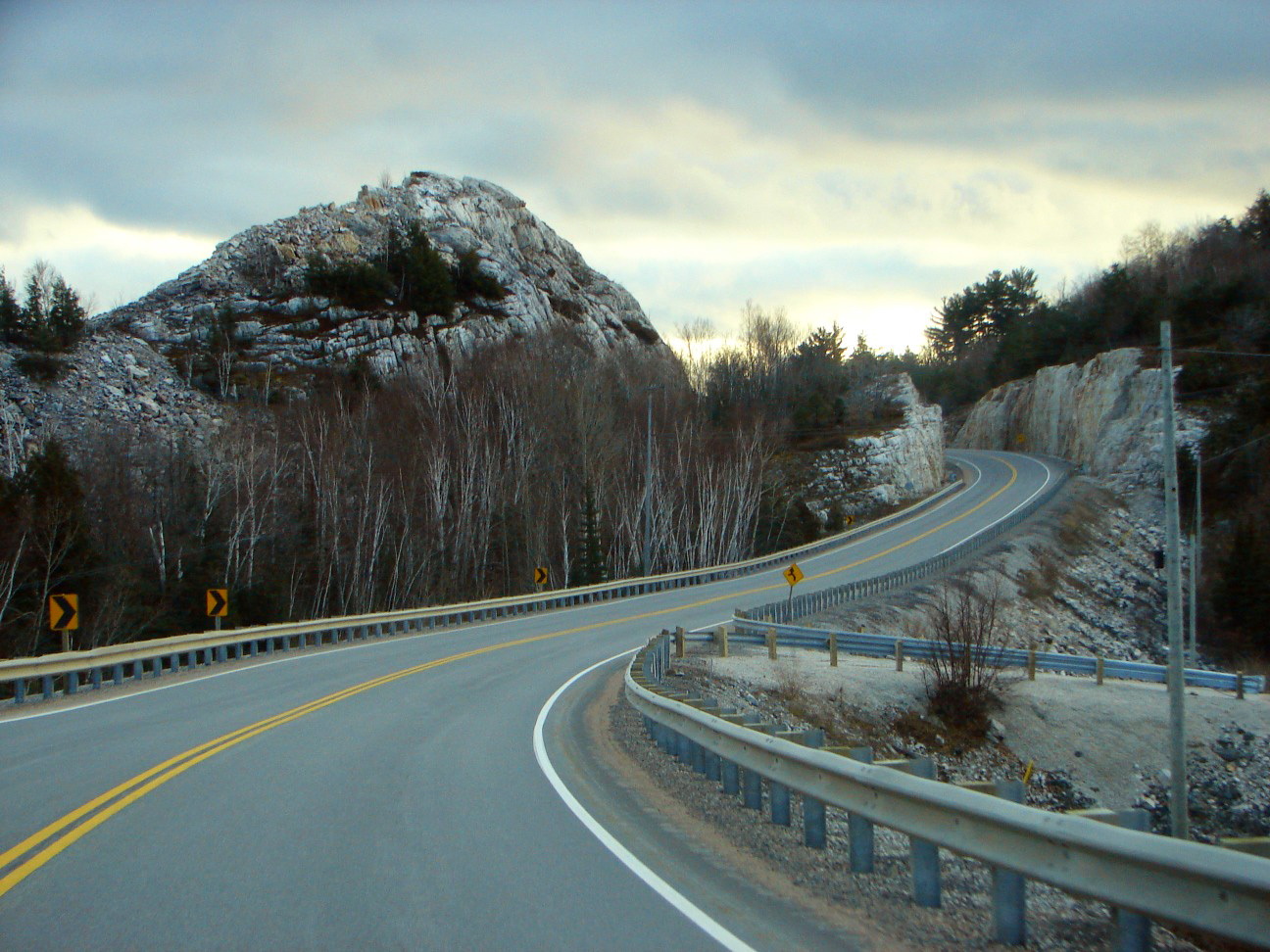
Looking south on Highway 6 through the La Cloche Mountains near Whitefish Falls

=== Port Dover to Hamilton ===
Highway 6 begins at Saint Patrick Street in the community of Port Dover, and stretches northward as a two-lane, undivided highway. The road travels into Haldimand County, through communities such as Jarvis and Hagersville, and the traffic flow increases. At Caledonia, the road bypasses the former Highway 6 section (Argyle Street) that passes the town centre of Caledonia and is routed outside the urban area Caledonia. This Caledonia Bypass was opened in 1983, and is a two-lane undivided freeway. The bypass terminates at Green's Road on the north side of Caledonia and Highway 6 proceeds eastbound on Green's Road for approximately 500 metres to Argyle St. North. Highway 6 then turns north on a four-lane undivided alignment for 5 km. Much of the old alignment north to near Rymal Road remains provincially maintained as unsigned Highway 7273.

In Hamilton, Highway 6 now uses a new alignment from Highway 403 to south of the Hamilton Airport, connecting with the southerly leg to Caledonia and Port Dover. The new alignment opened as an undivided two-lane freeway in November 2004, with capacity to expand it to full 4-lane divided freeway, and to extend to past Caledonia, by some time in the 2010s. As Highway 6 meets Highway 403 at a trumpet interchange, there is a concurrency for 17 kilometres (11 mi) within Hamilton. The concurrency ends at the Highway 6 junction directional-T interchange, at the Hamilton–Burlington boundary, near the Royal Botanical Gardens where Highway 6 turns northward towards Clappison's Corners.

=== Hamilton to Guelph ===
The section of Highway 6 between Highway 403 in Hamilton and Clappison's Corners (the intersection at Highway 5 West / Dundas Street) was previously a four lane arterial road with a centre turning lane. In 2009, this segment was converted to a freeway with an interchange at York Road. The interchange opened on May 23, 2009, and simultaneously, the intersection where Northcliffe/Plains Road met Highway 6 was closed permanently. A new service road was built on either side to connect Plains Road and various other residential streets to the York Road interchange. This section is now a fully controlled-access freeway with two southbound lanes and three northbound lanes (the extra lane being for trucks climbing the steep escarpment) as well a concrete median barrier with high mast lighting.

North of Clappison's Corners, most of the route is four lanes for general traffic, plus one centre lane for left turns, allowing for high travel speeds as the typical flow varies between 100 and 120 km/h (62 and 75 mph). However the section in Wellington County from Puslinch to Morriston (which is also known as Brock Road) has remained a two lane road since it runs through several small towns where it lacks sufficient right-of-way for widening. As this narrow segment suffers from significant congestion, a bypass is being considered which will connect to the Hanlon Expressway at Highway 401.

North of Morriston when Brock Road meets Highway 401 at a Parclo A2 interchange (the exits from Highway 401 are displayed as "Highway 6 South"), while through traffic on Brock Road continues as Wellington Road 46, the current Highway 6 designation is instead multiplexed with Highway 401 west of that junction. Although Wellington Road 46 (the previous alignment of Highway 6 prior to the opening of the Hanlon Expressway) does provide a more direct route to Guelph, the combination of Highway 401 and the Hanlon Expressway serves as an express bypass. The section where Highway 6 is concurrent with the Highway 401 freeway has the highest AADT (Annual Average Daily Traffic), at 85,000 automobiles per day in 2002. The Highway 6 routing splits from Highway 401 at a trumpet interchange with the Hanlon Expressway (the on-ramps from Highway 401 are signed as "Highway 6 North").

In Guelph, the road travels along the full length of the Hanlon Expressway (also known as the Hanlon Parkway), a four lane divided highway with mostly signalized level intersections and a couple grade-separated interchanges. The Ministry of Transportation is presently investigating the possibility of upgrading it to 400-series freeway standards by removing the remaining intersections. For 4 km, Highway 6 is concurrent with Highway 7, from the Wellington Street interchange north to where the Hanlon Expressway ends at Woodlawn Road. At Woodlawn, Highway 7 turns west onto Woodlawn Road, while Highway 6 turns east onto Woodlawn Road. Following Woodlawn, Highway 6 then turns north onto Woolwich Street, leaving the city of Guelph.

=== Guelph to Owen Sound ===
Highway 6 begins its concurrency with Highway 21 in Springmount, east of Owen Sound. The two highways form the only wrong-way concurrency in the provincial highway network.

As Highway 6 leaves Guelph and heads northwards through Wellington County, it narrows to two lanes and passes through farmland. The route meanders northward for 17 kilometres (11 mi) before entering Fergus, where it meets County Road 18 and County Road 19. North of Fergus, Highway 6 winds northwest for another 17 kilometres (11 mi) into Arthur meeting County Road 109 (former Highway 9) just south of the town. After exiting Arthur, the route continues northwest for 22 kilometres (14 mi) before entering Mount Forest and meeting an intersection with Highway 89.

The route enters Grey County as it curves and meanders northward into farmland. It progresses north for another 22 kilometres (14 mi) to Durham, where it intersects Highway 4. It continues for another 31 kilometres (19 mi) to Chatsworth, where it meets Highway 10 and travels northward concurrent with Highway 10 for 13 kilometres (8.1 mi) into Owen Sound. There it encounters an intersection, where Highway 10 ends; from here, Highway 26 continues north and then east to Collingwood and Barrie, while Ontario Highway 21 travels east and then south towards Sarnia. Highway 6 turns west onto Highway 21, forming the only wrong-way concurrency in Ontario (Highway 6 westbound traffic is labelled as going north, while Highway 21 westbound traffic is labelled as travelling south). The two routes pass through downtown Owen Sound and onwards into Springmount, where they disembark from one-another; Highway 21 continues west, while Highway 6 turns north into the Bruce Peninsula.

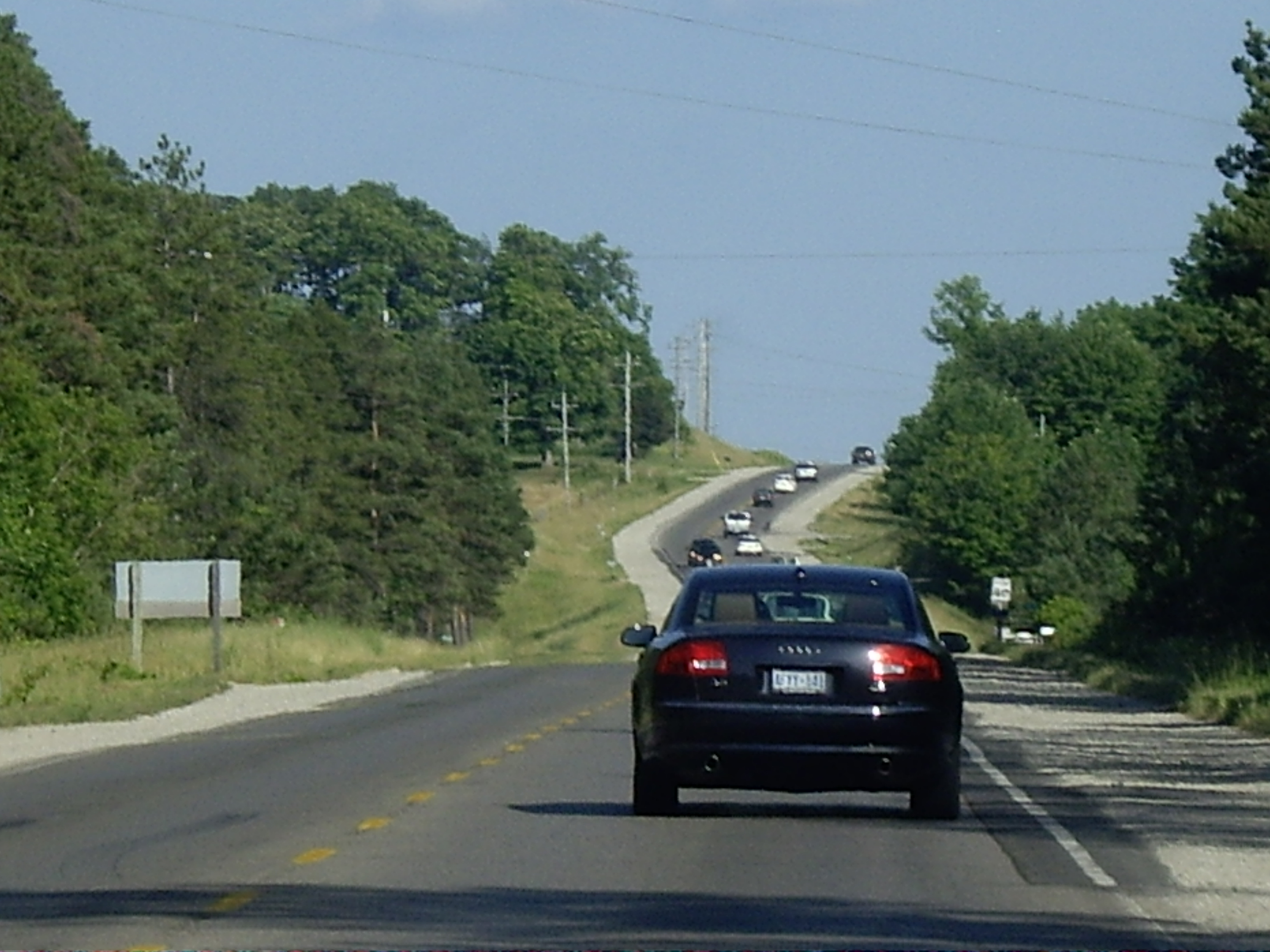
Highway 6 looking south near Wiarton

=== Owen Sound to Tobermory ===
At Springmount, Highway 6 ends its concurrency with Highway 21, and continues northwards into the Bruce Peninsula. The road remains as a two-lane highway for its full length up to Tobermory. Highway 6 spans 110 kilometres (68 mi) across the peninsula. It passes through communities such as Shallow Lake, Hepworth, Wiarton, and Ferndale. It is named Berford Street in Wiarton, and 10th Street in Owen Sound. Along the road, Bruce Peninsula National Park can be found. At Tobermory, the highway travels along Carlton Road and Front Street, where motorists must queue for the Chi-Cheemaun ferry to continue onwards to Manitoulin Island. The journey by ferry traverses waters of both Georgian Bay and Lake Huron, and takes approximately 1 hour and 45 minutes. The ferry service is not available from mid-October to early May.

=== South Baymouth to McKerrow ===
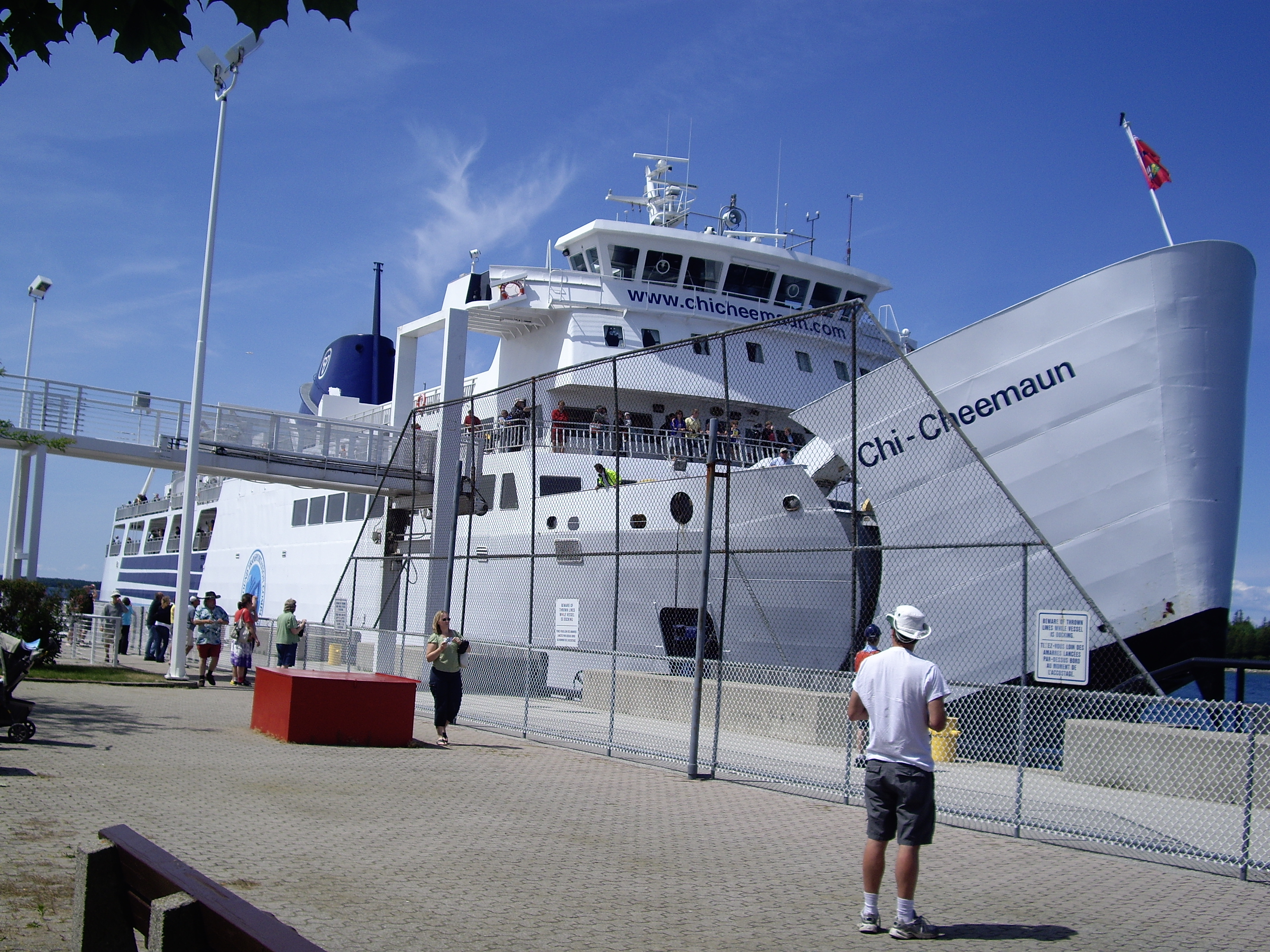
Chi-Cheemaun docking at Carlton Street

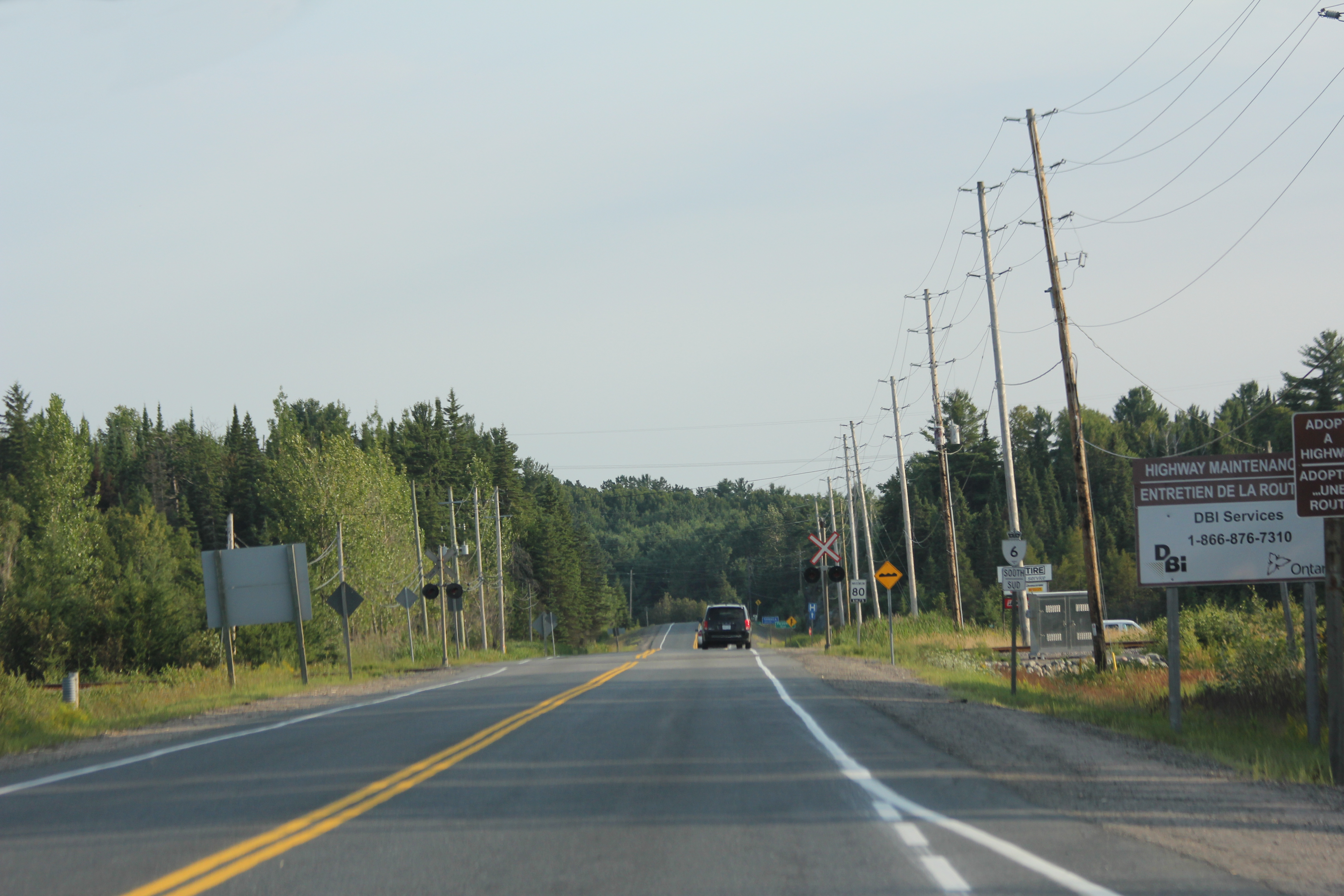
Looking south from the northern terminus of Highway 6

The Chi-Cheemaun ferry docks at South Baymouth, and Highway 6 continues as a two-lane highway. Highway 6 is both the main means of connection between Manitoulin Island and the rest of Ontario and the major highway on Manitoulin Island. Highway 540 and Highway 542 on Manitoulin Island link back to Highway 6. The section from South Baymouth to the Highway 542 junction has the least traffic on a given day, with an average of 610 vehicles passing as measured in 2010.

Highway 6 continues north, passing through communities such as Manitowaning, Sheguiandah, and Little Current. At Little Current, Highway 6 crosses the North Channel by the Little Current Swing Bridge, which swings open for 15 minutes of each daylight hour in the summer to allow boats to pass through the channel. As of 2021, studies by the MTO have proposed replacing the aging structure with a two-lane crossing.

After crossing the North Channel, Highway 6 climbs through the La Cloche Mountains near Whitefish Falls. Eventually, it arrives in Baldwin, north of Espanola. The highway officially ends at the Trans-Canada Highway (Highway 17) in the community of McKerrow, 117 kilometres (73 mi) from South Baymouth.

== History ==
=== Wagon trails ===
Prior to the establishment of Ontario's provincial highway network in 1920, the route that would become Highway 6 was composed of several early wagon trails created during the early settlement of what was then known as Upper Canada. These trails carved through an otherwise barren wilderness, connecting distant townsites: the Hamilton–Dover Plank Road between Port Dover and Hamilton, the Brock Road between Hamilton and Guelph, and the Garafraxa Road between Guelph and Sydenham (renamed to Owen Sound in 1851) — were opened in the 1830s and 1840s. Further north, the Southwest Diagonal and the Centre Road were built through the Bruce Peninsula in the 1840s and 1920s, respectively.

In 1837, Charles Rankin was hired by the Canada Company to survey a line between Guelph and a new town site on the southern shore of Georgian Bay known as Sydenham. The Canada Company was formed by several British investors to purchase, open, and settle the Huron Tract, a vast wilderness stretching from Guelph north to Georgian Bay and west to Lake Huron. Rankin's line crossed too many natural obstacles, a result of the tendency to build roads that were straight rather than following the natural topography. Consequently, a new line was surveyed in 1840 by the company's own surveyor, John McDonald, and construction along this new route began. Around the same time, the Van Norman Company constructed a plank road between Port Dover and Hamilton known as both the Hamilton Plank Road and the Dover Road. By 1848, the 119 km (74 mi) Garafraxa Road between Guelph and Sydenham was completed.

The remaining section between Hamilton and Guelph, known as the Brock Road, was constructed between 1848 and 1850 over the Guelph and Dundas wagon road. The wagon road, merely a trail through the forest, was cleared by the Canada Company in the 1820s to connect the fledgling town of Guelph with the established harbour at Hamilton, thus encouraging settlers to venture inland.

Further north, the Southwest Diagonal was surveyed in 1842 by Charles Rankin to provide a short route from the Sydenham townsite to the Hepworth townsite. This route passed through a large swamp and as a result remained an unimproved one lane trail into the 1920s. The Centre Road, the spine of the Bruce Peninsula, was built by the Department of Northern Development in the early 1920s, providing access to communities north of Wiarton. The route followed a telegraph line between Lion's Head and Tobermory and opened up a large area previously accessible only by water.

The latter two would not be incorporated into the original route of Highway 6.

=== Provincial highway ===
Highway 6 south of Guelph in 1921

When Ontario's Department of Public Highways first established a network of provincial highways on February 26, 1920 to be eligible for federal funding, it included the Hamilton and Dover Plank Road, the Brock Road and the Garafraxa Road. These roads were assumed from the various counties that held jurisdiction over them – Norfolk, Haldimand, Wentworth, Wellington and Grey – throughout June, July and August 1920.

Within Wentworth County, the construction of the Clappison Cut through the Niagara Escarpment was underway by 1921, with the aim of bypassing the winding old route that is known today as Old Guelph Road. The new route, which travelled straight along the boundary between East and West Flamboro, was assumed on January 12, 1921. The province and the City of Hamilton also constructed several new bridges across Cootes Paradise to create a new northwest entrance into Hamilton. The new entrance, connecting the Toronto–Hamilton Highway (later Highway 2) with the incomplete route up the escarpment to Clappison's Corners, was ceremonially opened by the Minister of Public Works and Highways, Frank Campbell Biggs, on August 23, 1922. The Clappison Cut was completed and paved in 1924.

Clappison Cut construction, 1920–1924

A set of rails were installed to remove excavated earth and rock

Completed work

Highway 5 and Highway 6 travelled concurrently from Highway 8 (Main Street) in downtown Hamilton to Clappison's Corners when route numbers were assigned in 1925. Highway 5 was 127.4 kilometres (79.2 mi) long at this time. This situation was short lived however, as Highway 5 was redirected west from Clappison's Corners to Peters Corners to meet Highway 8 on May 25, 1927. Highway 6, in turn, assumed the route of Highway 5 south to Jarvis. The route was extended further west in 1930, when the newly-renamed Department of Highways (DHO) assumed the road from Highway 8 at Peters Corners to Highway 24 west of St. George, as well as the Governor's Road between Highway 24 and Highway 2 at Paris. The 19.0 kilometres (11.8 mi) road between Highway 8 and Highway 24, through Beverley and South Dumfries was designated on June 18, while the 6.8-kilometre (4.2 mi) section of the Governor's Road, along the boundary between South Dumfries and Brantford Township, was designated several months later on September 24. These two segments were connected by a concurrency with Highway 24. This brought the length of the route to 114.3 kilometres (71.0 mi), including the approximately 16.1 kilometres (10.0 mi) of Bloor Street and Danforth Avenue between Jane Street and Sibley Avenue, within the Toronto city limits. Below the escarpment, the highway followed what is now the Old Guelph Road, meandering into Hamilton.

South of Hamilton, the road to Jarvis was numbered as Highway 5 when route numbers were assigned in the middle of 1925. Highway 5 and Highway 6 travelled concurrently from downtown Hamilton to Clappison's Corners. However, on May 25, 1927, several route numbers were revised, including Highways 5 and 6. Highway 5 was redirected west from Clappison's Corners to Peter's Corners to meet Highway 8. Highway 6, in turn, assumed the route of Highway 5 south to Jarvis. Exactly two weeks prior, on May 11, the Department of Public Highways had assumed the road between Jarvis and Port Dover; this also became a section of Highway 6, establishing its southern terminus for the next seven decades.

North of the escarpment to Highway 401, Highway 6 follows the same route that it did in 1920, the Brock Road. North of Highway 401, which didn't exist before the 1950s, the route continued through Guelph along what is now Gordon Street, Norfolk Street and Woolwich Street. This section has since been replaced by the Hanlon Expressway, built throughout the 1970s.

North of Guelph to Owen Sound, the route also follows the same route as it did in 1920, with some small deviations. The section from Fergus north towards Arthur followed the route was of the old Fergus and Arthur Road Company. A "cheap attempt" at paving had been made in the 1920s. The section was straightened, widened and paved with asphalt-based "penetration pavement" in 1930.

On April 1, 1937, the Department of Northern Development was absorbed into the Department of Highways, which subsequently took over many development roads as provincial highways. Most of the northern sections of Highway 6 were included amongst these. Highway 68 was designated from Little Current north to Espanola on August 11, 1937. Two weeks later, on August 25, Highway 6 was designated in Bruce County, from Wiarton north to Tobermory. The section within Grey County was designated several months later on November 3. The lone remaining section of what would eventually become today's Highway 6, across Manitoulin Island, was not designated until December 7, 1955. The entirety of Highway 68 eventually became part of Highway 6 in the early to mid- 1980.

The grand entrance to Hamilton, along what is now York Boulevard, was constructed in the early 1930s as one of the earliest examples of elegant road and bridge design in the province, and was used as the prototype for The Middle Road.

=== Expressways and bypasses ===
==== Longwoods Road extension ====
Under the leadership of Thomas B. McQuesten, who would soon introduce the freeway to Ontario, a new grand entrance to Hamilton was planned. It would cross the Desjardins Canal and terminate at a traffic circle, with Highway 2 continuing east and Highway 6 north. This new road, known as the Longwoods Road Extension, was built partially as a depression-relief project in the early 1930s. Upon completion in 1932, Highway 2 and Highway 6 were routed off the Old Guelph Road onto the new route into Hamilton. This configuration remained until the construction of Highway 403 during the early 1960s, which was built over the Longwoods Road Extension.

==== Mount Hope Bypass ====
Due to the narrow spacing of buildings in the village of Mount Hope, a bypass of the village was built in the mid- to late 1950s. The original route is now known as Homestead Drive. The bypass opened on April 26, 1957, at which point the old routing was decommissioned. It was subsequently bypassed, when the new Highway 6 opened to the southwest of John C. Munro Hamilton International Airport, on November 26, 2004.

==== Hanlon Expressway ====
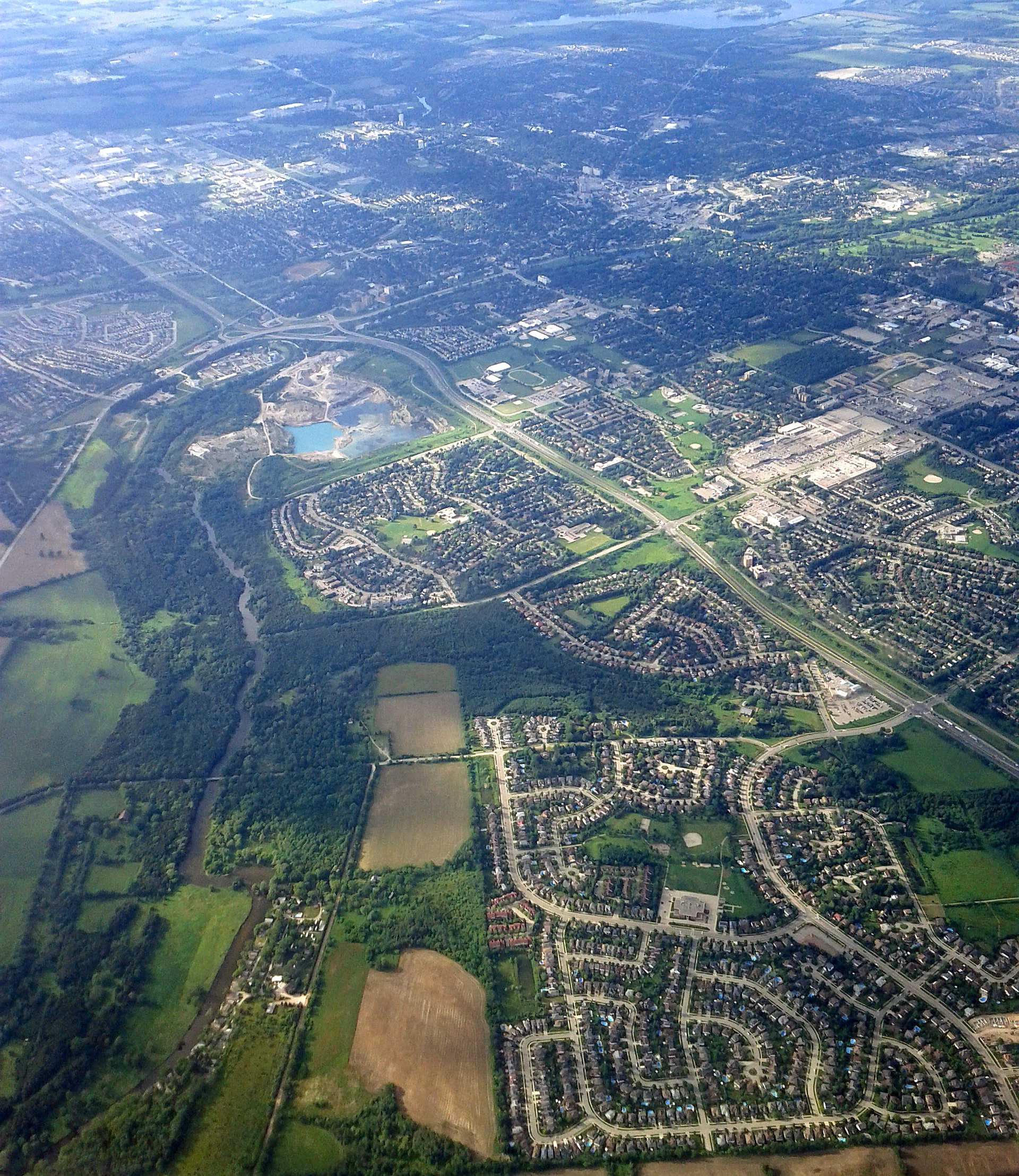
The Hanlon Expressway in Guelph

With the rapid suburban expansion of Guelph in the 1950s and 1960s, a revised transportation plan was conceived to handle the increasing traffic load. The Guelph Area Transportation Study was completed in 1967, and recommended a new controlled-access highway to allow through-traffic on Highway 6 to bypass the city. Route planning, engineering and design began on October 2, 1967 and was subsequently completed in 1969. Construction began between Waterloo Avenue and Stone Road in 1970; this section opened on June 28, 1972. The next section, from Stone Road to Clair Road, opened in October 1973. Work on the northern section from Waterloo Avenue to Woodlawn Road began in August 1974. It and the final section south to Highway 401 were opened on November 7, 1975.

Initially, the 15.4-kilometre-long (9.6 mi) road featured no interchanges. However, the MTO has long-intended to upgrade the route to a freeway. Construction of the Wellington Avenue interchange began in October 1998; it opened in July 2001. On April 30, 2012, construction began on the Laird Road interchange. It partially opened on the week of November 11, 2013, and was fully opened on November 29, 2013, in a public ceremony attended by local officials as well as Guelph MPP Liz Sandals.

A full interchange was constructed between County Road 34 and Maltby Road which opened in 2025. The intersections with both roads were then closed, and County Road 34 now crosses the expressway via a new overpass, while Maltby Road terminates at a cul-de-sac on both sides of the expressway.

==== Caledonia Bypass ====
In 1976, a corridor study was completed on Highway 6 between Port Dover and Hamilton, indicating a need for a bypass of Caledonia due to the aging multi-span bridge over the Grand River, to improve capacity to the developing areas of Nanticoke near Lake Erie, and to reduce the high-volume of truck traffic passing through the town. Construction began in late 1979 on structures to cross the Grand River and to carry rail lines and three crossroads over the bypass. The bypass was completed in the fall of 1983. The old route through Caledonia is now known as Argyle Street.

==== Clappison Cut ====
In early 2002, it was announced that the section of Highway 6 north of Hamilton, from Highway 403 north to beyond Highway 5, would be widened to a five lane freeway, with the northbound carriageway featuring an additional truck-climbing lane. This work began in 2006, widening and dividing the highway up the Clappison Cut. The York Road interchange opened on May 23, 2009, following completion of this work. The Plains Road/Northcliffe Avenue intersection was closed the night before and a new section of Plains Road opened on the same day as the interchange. The project to upgrade this segment of Highway 6 was $34 million.

=== Downloading and changes to route ===
Construction of the Clappison Cut in 1922

Similar angle in 2011; Highway 6 descends the Niagara Escarpment towards Burlington through the Clappison Cut as a five lane freeway

On April 1, 1997, Highway 6 was decommissioned south of Hepworth to Highway 21. The entire length of Highway 70 was subsequently renumbered Highway 6 to rectify the discontinuity. On the same day, the section between the southern terminus at former Highway 24 to the west side of the Lynn River. These reduced the length of Highway 6 from 488.5 kilometres (303.5 mi) to 472.4 kilometres (293.5 mi).

A new 9.7-kilometre-long (6.0 mi) segment of Highway 6 was opened to the southwest of John C. Munro Hamilton International Airport in 2004. This building of this route had been planned since the construction of the Caledonia Bypass in 1983. However, concrete plans were not announced until January 1993. However, it had already drawn criticism due to an old-growth forest located in the path of the route. The planned highway would cost a projected $100 million. However, these plans never came to fruition, and by 1997 a new, shorter route was in the planning stages. Construction of the $33 million route was announced on May 26, 2000 by Transportation Minister David Turnbull, and began in July 2003.

The new route was opened on November 26, 2004. The section through Hamilton at the time followed Upper James Street through the Claremont Access onto the one-way pairings of Wellington Street and Victoria Avenue then Main Street and King Street. It turned north on Dundurn Street and crossed Cootes Paradise via York Boulevard before turning onto Plains Road and meeting the current route at the now-closed intersection. The responsibility for this routing was subsequently transferred to the City of Hamilton.

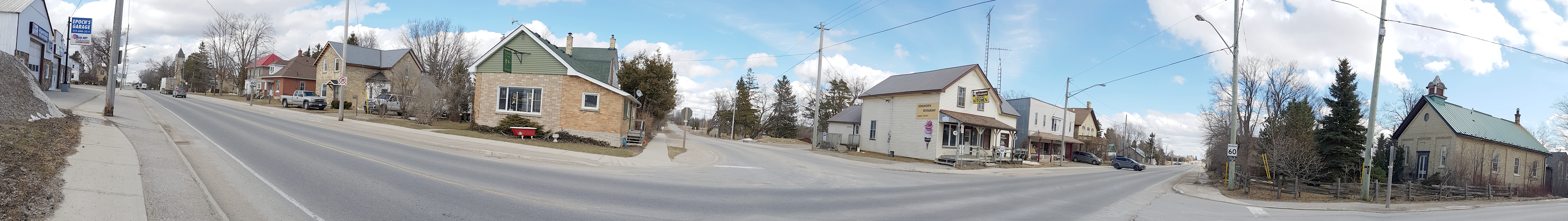
Highway 6 in Kenilworth

== Future ==
Three sections of Highway 6 are undergoing planning as of 2022.

- Highway 6 South from Upper James Street to Highway 403 is proposed to expand to four lanes, undergoing preliminary design as of February 17, 2022
- The Morriston Bypass (from Maddaugh Road, south of Puslinch, to Highway 401 west of Morriston) is a proposed new two or four lane alignment of Highway 6 currently in early works construction.
- The Hanlon Expressway Mid-Block Interchange project will result in a new interchange between Wellington County Road 34 and Maltby Road, as well as the removal of the existing intersections between the Hanlon Expressway and those two roads. A design–build contract for this work was awarded in February 2022.
- Long-term plans call for Highway 6 to be rerouted along a potential extension of the Hanlon south of Highway 401 to meet the four lane segment of Highway 6 south of Freelton. This would bypass the congested two-lane section of Highway 6 (also known as Brock Road, signed as Highway 6 South) in Wellington County from Puslinch to Morriston which runs through several small towns where it lacks sufficient right-of-way for widening. Between the Hanlon Expressway (signed as Highway 6 North) and the proposed bypass of Brock Road, the section of Highway 401 between these segments is scheduled to be widened to ten lanes.

== Major intersections ==
The following table lists the major junctions along Highway 6, as noted by the Ministry of Transportation of Ontario.

Division	Location	km	mi	Exit	Destinations	Notes
Norfolk	Halfway House Corner	−7.7	−4.8		County Highway 6 begins County Highway 24 – Simcoe	Former southern terminus; formerly Highway 24
Norfolk	Port Dover	−0.6	−0.37		County Road 5 north (Chapman Street)	
Norfolk	Port Dover	0.0	0.0		Highway 6 begins County Highway 6 ends	Current southern terminus; portion west of Port Dover downloaded in the late 1990s
Norfolk–Haldimand boundary		5.8	3.6		Norfolk County Road 3 west / Haldimand County Road 3 east (St. Johns Road East)	
Haldimand		10.3	6.4		County Road 70	
Haldimand	Jarvis	13.4	8.3		Highway 3 – St. Thomas, Fort Erie	Jarvis Connecting Link
Haldimand	Jarvis	15.0	9.3		County Road 69 (Nanticoke Creek Parkway)	Jarvis Connecting Link
Haldimand		16.3	10.1		County Road 55 (Nanticoke Road)	
Haldimand		21.1	13.1		County Road 18 (Sandusk Road)	
Haldimand	Hagersville	23.5	14.6		County Road 9 west / Parkview Road	Hagersville Connecting Link
Haldimand	Hagersville	23.5	14.6		County Road 20 (King Street)	Hagersville Connecting Link
Haldimand		31.0	19.3		County Road 29 (4th Line)	
Haldimand	Caledonia	35.4	22.0		Argyle Street South	Beginning of Caledonia Bypass; controlled-access Super 2
Haldimand	Caledonia	38.7– 38.9	24.0– 24.2	Bridge over the Grand River		
Haldimand	Caledonia	38.7– 38.9	24.0– 24.2		County Highway 54	No access; formerly Highway 54
Haldimand	Caledonia	40.8	25.4		Greens Road	To County Highway 54
Haldimand	Caledonia	41.9	26.0		Argyle Street North County Road 66 east	End of Caledonia Bypass
Hamilton		48.0	29.8		Highway 7273 (Upper James Street)	Formerly Highway 6 prior to November 2004; to City Road 65
Hamilton		50.0	31.1		Highway 7274 (Airport Road Connection)	To John C. Munro Hamilton International Airport
Hamilton		54.8	34.1		Book Road	
Hamilton		Freeway begins				
Hamilton		56.2	34.9	—	Garner Road	Southbound exit and northbound entrance; no exit from Highway 403 east; formerly Highway 53
Hamilton		57.5	35.7	61	Highway 403 west – Woodstock	Southern end of Highway 403 concurrency; exit numbers follow Highway 403
Hamilton		60.4	37.5	64	Lincoln M. Alexander Parkway; Rousseaux Street	
Hamilton		65.2	40.5	69	Aberdeen Avenue	
Hamilton		66.6	41.4	70	City Road 8 (Main Street)	Formerly Highway 2 / Highway 8; entrance ramps from nearby King Street
Hamilton		68.9	42.8	73	York Boulevard	Westbound exit and eastbound exit; formerly Highway 6 south / Highway 2
Hamilton–Halton boundary	Hamilton–Burlington boundary	70.3	43.7	74	Highway 403 east to Queen Elizabeth Way – Toronto, Niagara	Northern end of Highway 403 concurrency
Hamilton–Halton boundary	Hamilton–Burlington boundary	71.7	44.6	—	York Road	
Hamilton–Halton boundary	Hamilton–Burlington boundary	Freeway ends				
Hamilton		73.3	45.5		Highway 5 west / City Road 5 east (Dundas Street)	Clappison's Corners
Hamilton		77.2	48.0		Millgrove Sideroad	
Hamilton		83.3	51.8		Carlisle Road	
Hamilton		86.4	53.7		City Road 97 west – Cambridge	Freelton; formerly Highway 97
Wellington	Puslinch	90.1	56.0		County Road 36 east	
Wellington	Puslinch	91.0	56.5	299	County Road 46 north (Brock Road) – Guelph Highway 401 east – Toronto	Beginning of Highway 401 concurrency; exit numbers follow Highway 401
Wellington	Puslinch	95.4	59.3	295	Highway 401 west – Cambridge, London	End of Highway 401 concurrency; southern end of Hanlon Expressway
Wellington	Puslinch	96.5	60.0		County Road 34	Signalized intersection replaced with an overpass
Wellington	Puslinch	97.5	60.6	—	Midblock Interchange	Interchange opened August 12, 2024
Wellington	Puslinch	98.5	61.2		Concession Road 4 Maltby Road West	Closed with opening of Midblock Interchange
Guelph		100.5	62.4		Clair Road West; Phelan Drive	Closed with opening of Laird Road Interchange
Guelph		101.1	62.8	—	Laird Road	Grade-separated as of November 29, 2013
Guelph		103.6	64.4		Downey Road (west); Kortright Road West (east)	
Guelph		104.6	65.0		Stone Road West	
Guelph		105.5	65.6		College Avenue West	
Guelph		107.1	66.5	—	Highway 7 east (Wellington Street) – Brampton	Beginning of Highway 7 concurrency; grade-separated as of July 2001; formerly Highway 24
Guelph		108.1	67.2		Paisley Road	
Guelph		108.9	67.7		Willow Road	
Guelph		109.8	68.2		Speedvale Avenue West	
Guelph		110.8	68.8		Highway 7 west (Woodlawn Road West) – Waterloo	End of Highway 7 concurrency; northern end of Hanlon Expressway; Highway 6 follows Woodlawn Road West; beginning of Guelph Connecting Link
Guelph		113.1	70.3		Woolwich Street / Woodlawn Road East	Formerly Highway 6 south
Guelph		113.4	70.5		End of Guelph Connecting Link	
Wellington	Guelph/Eramosa	114.3	71.0		County Road 30	
Wellington	Guelph/Eramosa	115.4	71.7		County Road 7 north (Elora Road) – Elora	
Wellington	Guelph/Eramosa	117.3	72.9		County Road 38 south (Victoria Road North)	
Wellington	Guelph/Eramosa	118.3	73.5		County Road 51 west (Guelph–Nichol Townline)	
Wellington	Guelph/Eramosa–Centre Wellington boundary	120.8	75.1		County Road 22 east	
Wellington	Centre Wellington	128.8	80.0		County Road 18 east (Belsyde Avenue)	Fergus Connecting Link
Wellington	Centre Wellington	129.8	80.7		County Road 18 west (St. Andrew Street) – Elora	Fergus Connecting Link
Wellington	Centre Wellington	130.2	80.9		County Road 19 east (Garafraxa Street)	Fergus Connecting Link
Wellington	Centre Wellington–Mapleton boundary	138.8	86.2		County Road 17 west	
Wellington	Wellington North	148.3	92.1		County Road 109 – Orangeville, Harriston	Formerly Highway 9
Wellington	Wellington North	149.1	92.6		County Road 14 north (Frederick Street)	Arthur Connecting Link
Wellington	Wellington North	172.5	107.2		Highway 89 – Harriston, Shelburne	Mount Forest Connecting Link
Wellington–Grey boundary	Wellington North–West Grey–Southgate boundary	175.1	108.8		County Road 109	
Grey	West Grey–Southgate boundary	177.0	110.0		County Road 6 south	
Grey	West Grey–Southgate boundary	182.4	113.3		County Road 9 west – Ayton	
Grey	West Grey–Southgate boundary	186.2	115.7		County Road 9 east – Dundalk	
Grey	West Grey	195.3	121.4		Douglas Street	Beginning of Durham Connecting Link
Grey	West Grey	196.5	122.1		County Road 4 (Lambton Street)	Formerly Highway 4
Grey	West Grey	197.2	122.5		County Road 27 west (Durham Road)	Old alignment of Highway 4; end of Durham Connecting Link
Grey	West Grey	206.5	128.3		County Road 12 east	
Grey	West Grey–Chatsworth boundary	212.0	131.7		County Road 25 west	Dornoch
Grey	Chatsworth	219.4	136.3		County Road 24 east (Chatsworth Road 24)	
Grey	Chatsworth	227.0	141.1		County Road 40 west	Beginning of Chatsworth Connecting Link
Grey	Chatsworth	228.6	142.0		Highway 10 south – Brampton	Southern end of Highway 10 concurrency; end of Chatsworth Connecting Link
Grey	Chatsworth–Georgian Bluffs–Meaford boundary	230.8	143.4		County Road 16 west	
Grey	Georgian Bluffs–Meaford boundary	238.5	148.2		County Road 18	
Grey	Owen Sound	240.2	149.3		Superior Street / 4th Street East	Beginning of Owen Sound Connecting Link
Grey	Owen Sound	241.5	150.1		Highway 10 ends / Highway 21 begins / Highway 26 east (9th Avenue E / 10th Street E) – Collingwood, Barrie	Highway 10 northern terminus; Highway 21 northern terminus; southern end of Highway 21 wrong-way concurrency; Highway 26 western terminus
Grey	Owen Sound	242.9	150.9		County Road 1 north (2nd Avenue West)	
Grey	Owen Sound	244.1	151.7		County Road 17B north / 9th Avenue West	End of Owen Sound Connecting Link
Grey	Georgian Bluffs	246.8	153.4		Highway 21 south – Southampton, Goderich County Road 18 south	End of Highway 21 concurrency; formerly Highway 70 north
Grey	Georgian Bluffs	248.0	154.1		County Road 17 north	
Grey	Georgian Bluffs	257.0	159.7		County Road 170 east – Copperkettle	
Bruce	South Bruce Peninsula	261.4	162.4		County Road 10 south (Bruce Street) County Road 8 west (Queen Street) – Sauble Beach	Hepworth; formerly Highway 70 south
Bruce–Grey boundary	South Bruce Peninsula–Georgian Bluffs boundary	270.6	168.1		Grey County Road 17 east	
Bruce	South Bruce Peninsula	273.2	169.8		County Road 1 east (Frank Street) – Keppel Croft	Wiarton Connecting Link
Bruce	South Bruce Peninsula	274.5	170.6		County Road 13 west (Jenny Street) – Oliphant	Wiarton Connecting Link
Bruce	South Bruce Peninsula	276.7	171.9		County Road 9 north – Colpoy's Bay	
Bruce	Northern Bruce Peninsula	303.6	188.6		County Road 9 south (Ferndale Road) – Lion's Head	Ferndale
Bruce	Northern Bruce Peninsula	356.3	221.4		Big Tub Road / Front Street	Tobermory Ferry Docks
Georgian Bay				MS Chi-Cheemaun ferry between Tobermory and South Baymouth — 45.0 km (28.0 mi)		
Manitoulin	Tehkummah	356.3	221.4		Water Street / Given Road	South Baymouth Ferry Docks; the entire route from this location northerly to McKerrow was designated as Highway 68 prior to 1980.
Manitoulin	Tehkummah	369.2	229.4		Highway 542 west – Sandfield, Mindemoya, Gore Bay, Tehkummah	
Manitoulin	Northeastern Manitoulin and the Islands	420.3	261.2		Highway 540 west – Gore Bay	Little Current
Manitoulin	Northeastern Manitoulin and the Islands	421.2	261.7	Little Current Swing Bridge over the North Channel		
Sudbury	Espanola	465.8	289.4		Foster Drive	Espanola Connecting Link
Sudbury	Espanola	469.7	291.9		Tudhope Street	Espanola Connecting Link
Sudbury	Baldwin	472.4	293.5		Highway 17 / TCH – Sault Ste. Marie, Sudbury	McKerrow
1.000 mi = 1.609 km; 1.000 km = 0.621 mi: Closed/former; Concurrency terminus; Incomplete access; Tolled; Route transition; Unopened
