= Little Current Swing Bridge =

Swing bridge in Little Current, Ontario

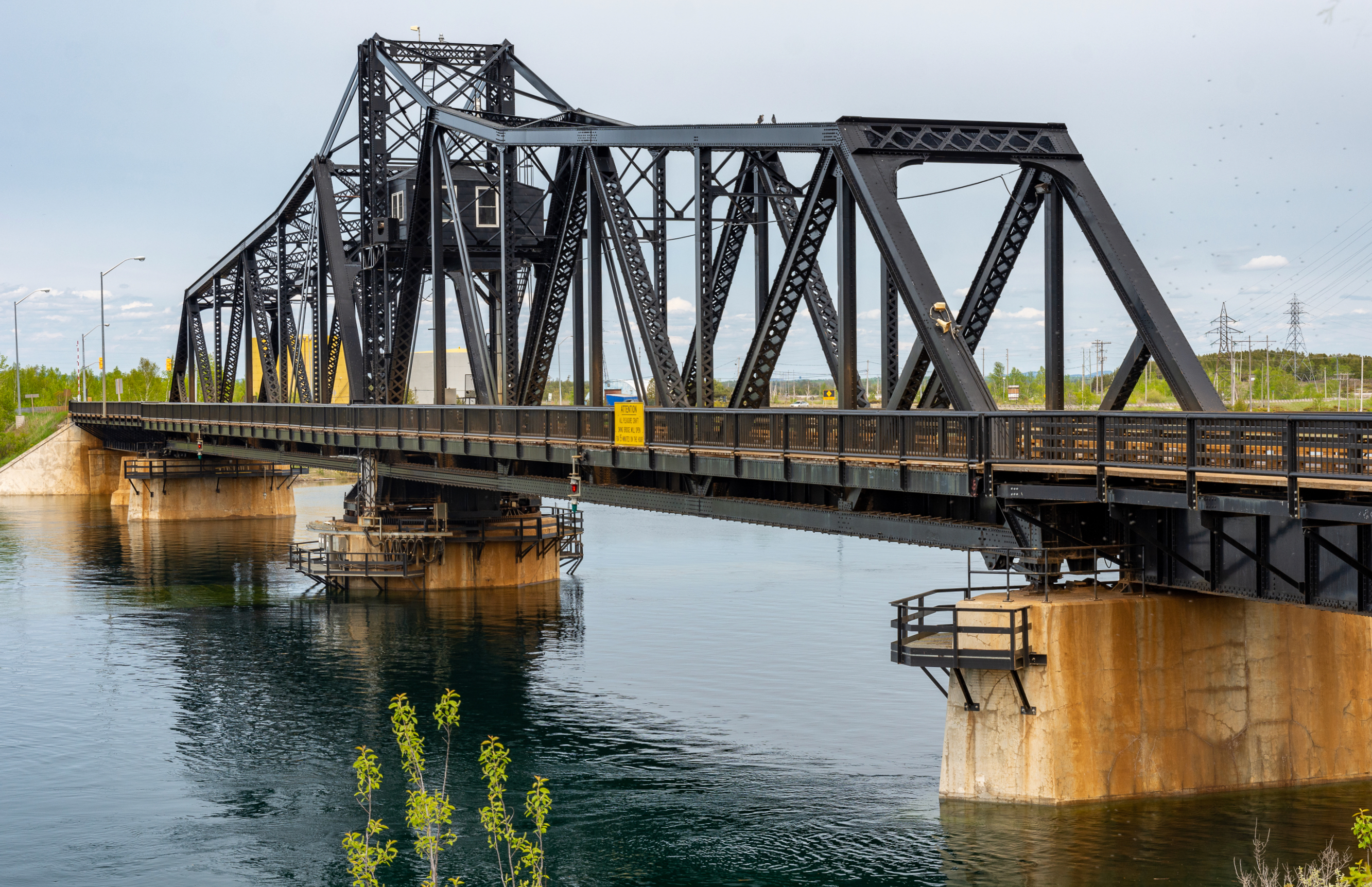
- Viewed from the southwest in 2019
- Coordinates: 45°58′49″N 81°54′50″W
- Carries: Highway 6
- Crosses: North Channel (Lake Huron)
- Locale: Little Current, Ontario
- Maintained by: Ontario Ministry of Transportation

Characteristics
- Design: swing bridge

History
- Opened: 1913

Location
- Interactive map of Little Current Swing Bridge

The Little Current Swing Bridge is a swing bridge in the Canadian province of Ontario, located at the community of Little Current in the town of Northeastern Manitoulin and the Islands.

== Design ==
The bridge carries Highway 6 (formerly Highway 68) across a narrow channel separating Manitoulin Island from the much smaller Goat Island, forming the only land access. It consists of two 21 m (70 ft) deck plate girder approaches on the north end (Goat Island) and a single 18 m (60 ft) deck plate girder approach on the south end (Manitoulin Island), with a 112 m (368 ft) through swing bridge span. The swing bridge sits 5.3 m (17.5 ft) above mean water level, and provides a 48 m (160 ft) opening on either side of the central pier for water passage. The width of the bridge is 15’1” for loads.

== Construction and operation ==
Construction of the bridge was started by the Algoma Eastern Railway with the abutments and piers being built in 1912 and the bridge structure being erected in 1913. The Algoma Eastern Railway began operating trains across the bridge to the community of Little Current in October 1913. The Algoma Eastern Railway was leased by Canadian Pacific Railway (CPR) in March 1930 and control of the bridge passed at this time to the CPR.

Due to navigable waters protection legislation, the CPR policy was to leave the bridge's swing span in the open position at all times for marine traffic, except when a train needed to cross.

In 1946, the CPR and the provincial Department of Highways of Ontario came to an agreement that saw the bridge modified to permit road vehicle traffic in addition to rail traffic. As a result, operation of the swing span saw the span left in the closed position to permit both rail and road vehicle traffic to cross, although a CPR employee was stationed at the bridge to open the swing span should it be required for marine traffic.

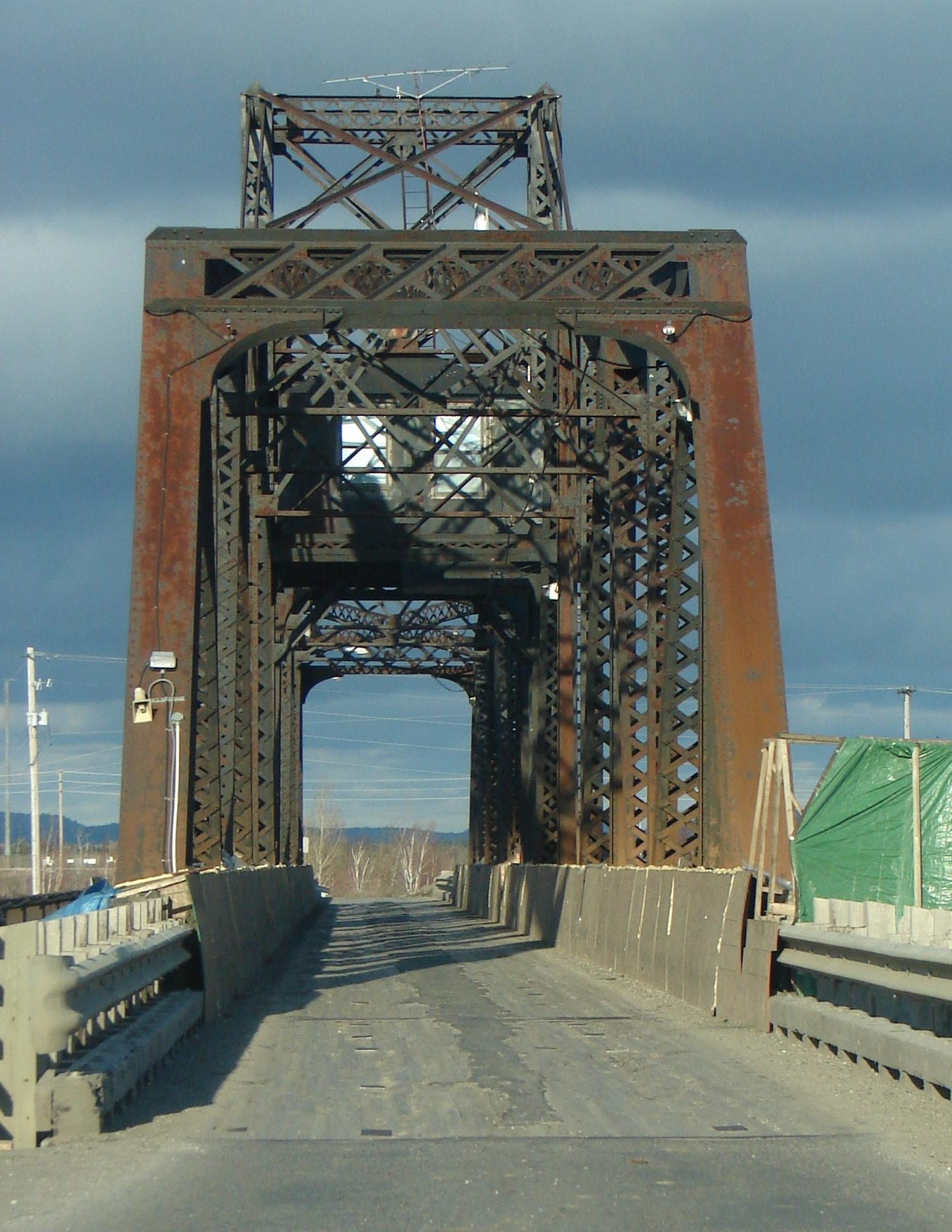
The single lane of the Little Current Swing Bridge

Rail service to Little Current and Manitoulin Island was abandoned by CPR in the 1980s; with the end of the tracks then located at a ship-loading facility in Turner on the Goat Island side of the bridge. As a result, CPR transferred ownership of the bridge to the Ministry of Transportation and it has been used exclusively by road vehicle traffic ever since. CPR subsequently abandoned rail service from Espanola to Turner in the 1990s and removed the tracks, leaving only the railway bed and bridge structures such as the Little Current Swing Bridge as a reminder of Manitoulin Island's rail transportation heritage.

Currently, operation of the swing span strongly favours highway traffic, as it stays in the closed position so that road vehicles can use it except for the first fifteen minutes of each daylight hour during the spring, summer and fall when it opens to permit marine traffic to pass. At night in the spring, summer, and fall as well as when the shipping channel is closed to marine traffic during the winter, the swing span remains in the closed position at all times. Originally powered by a gasoline engine, the mechanism for the swing span was upgraded by the Ministry of Transportation to an electric motor in 2003. Due to the single vehicle lane, each end of the bridge is equipped with traffic signals (7 lights northbound and 2 lights southbound); the signals on the Little Current abutment being the only installation of traffic signals on Manitoulin Island. From mid-October to early May when the ferry MS Chi-Cheemaun is not in operation to carry passengers from the Bruce Peninsula, the bridge is the only road link to Manitoulin Island.

The bridge has been designated an Ontario Heritage site. Studies for a replacement began in 2018, as the bridge's mechanics have been failing and its steel deteriorating. The preferred option, announced in 2021, will see a new two-lane swing bridge built just west of the existing bridge.

== Images ==
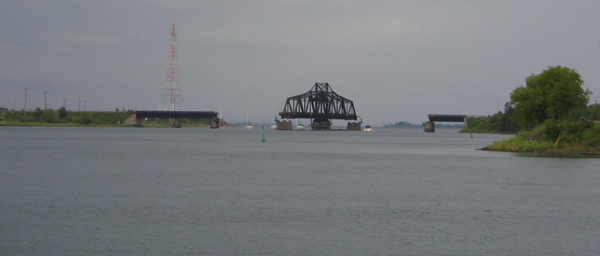
Little Current Swing Bridge (open position) looking east, from Town Dock, 2006

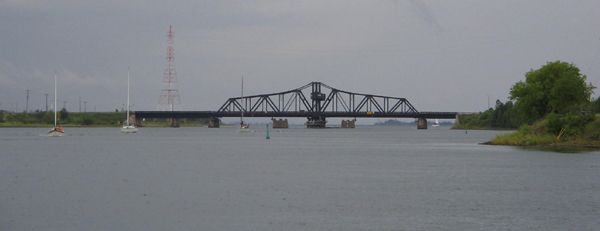
Little Current Swing Bridge (closed position) looking east, from Town Dock

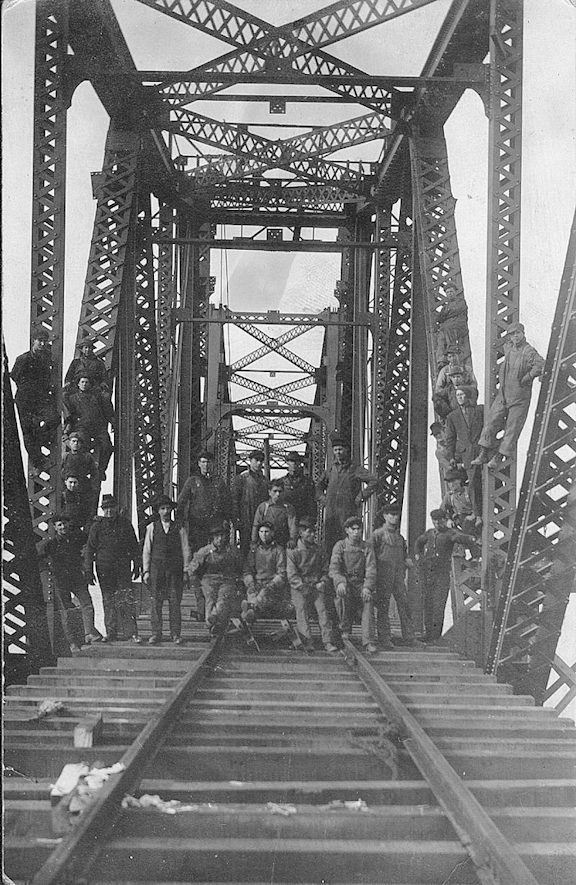
Group photo of the construction crew around the time of completion

== See also ==
- List of bridges in Canada
