= Little Current, Ontario =

Little Current
- Unincorporated community
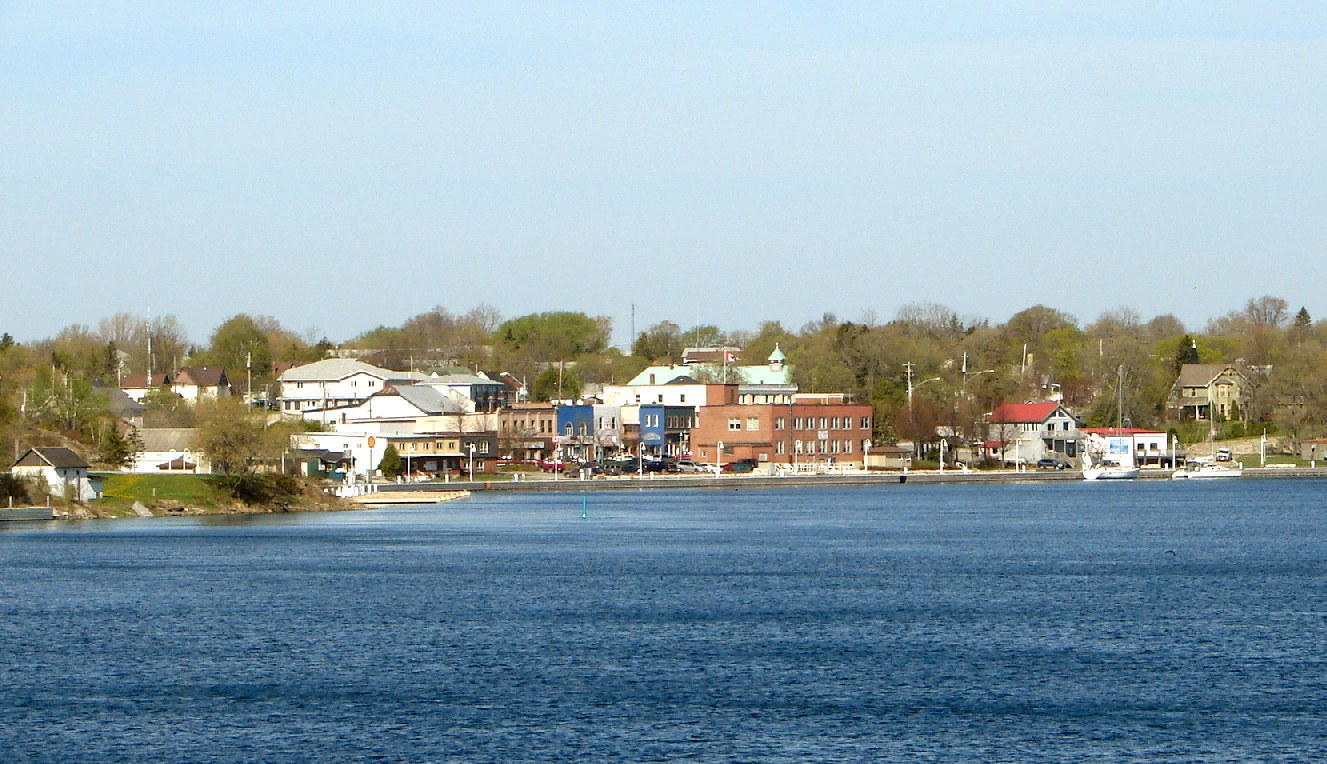

- Location within Ontario
- Coordinates: 45°58′43″N 81°55′29″W
- Country: Canada
- Province: Ontario
- District: Manitoulin
- Municipality: Northeastern Manitoulin and the Islands
- Incorporated: 1890
- Dissolved (amalgamated): 1998

Area
  - Land: 2.23 km^{2} (0.86 sq mi)
- Elevation: 187 m (615 ft)

Population (2021)
  - Total: 728
  - Density: 542.6/km^{2} (1,405/sq mi)
- Time zone: UTC-5 (EST)
  - Summer (DST): UTC-4 (EDT)
- Postal code: P0P
- Area codes: 705, 249

Little Current is a community in the Town of Northeastern Manitoulin and the Islands, Ontario, Canada, in the northeast end of Manitoulin Island. It is located at the namesake narrow channel that connects the North Channel to the west with the Georgian Bay to the east.

Its name refers to the currents that flow through the narrow passage that separates Manitoulin from Goat Island.

== History ==
In the early 19th century, the location was an Anishinaabe settlement called Wewebijiwang, or known as Petit Courant by the Voyageurs. The site was regularly visited by traders from the Hudson's Bay Company trading post at La Cloche. Its convenient location along the North Channel allowed the Indigenous to trade with passing steamboats and provide accommodation to travellers. In 1856, the Hudson's Bay Company tried to open a trading post there, even building a store, factor's house, and wharf, but its licence was withdrawn after residents complained about the threat the company would pose to their trade. In 1860, "Wyabegwong" had a population of 52, and was a "vibrant fishing and trading community".

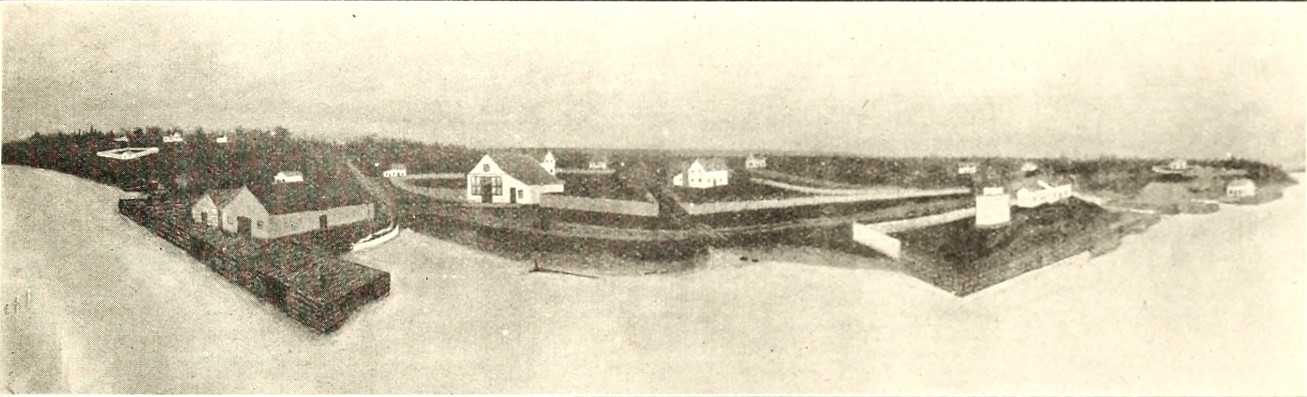
Little Current in 1870

After the signing of the Manitoulin Treaty of 1862, the indigenous population was gradually relocated to reserves, such as Sucker Creek 23. In 1864, the population had risen to 79, consisting of a mix of natives and non-natives. That same year, its post office opened and the town site was surveyed, which were both given the name Shaftesbury at that time (but was never used except for some legal purposes). Throughout the 1860s, more non-native settlers arrived at Little Current, taking over the profitable steamboat trade from the indigenous. Reverend Jabez Sims noted at the time: "The settlement of the Island by the whites has operated very much against the interests of the Indians." By 1870, the community had several wharfs, general stores, hotels, and an Anglican mission. In 1874, a small sawmill was built, followed by two larger mills in the mid-1880s.

In 1873, the Township of Howland, which included Little Current, was incorporated, with James Burnet as its first reeve. In 1890, Little Current separated from the township and was incorporated as a town, with Thomas Capman Sims as its first mayor. In 1892, a telegraph line was built to Little Current, and extended as a telephone system to most of Manitoulin.

In 1902, the place was described as:

Little Current occupies an important position, being situated on the south side of the narrow channel through which all vessels must pass in navigating between Georgian Bay and North Channel. ... The town of Little Current has good stores and hotels, telegraph and telephone lines, wharves with ample water alongside, and daily steamboat connection with Georgian Bay ports, and with Sault Ste. Marie.

In 1913, a swing bridge for the Algoma Eastern Railway was built over the Little Current channel, and the town became the western terminus of the rail line that connected it with Sudbury. The bridge was converted to dual train and automobile traffic in 1946, passenger service on mixed-trains discontinued in 1963, and the tracks were removed in the mid 1980s.

On January 1, 1998, the Town of Little Current was merged with the Township of Howland and unorganized small islands around Manitoulin to form the new Town of Northeastern Manitoulin and the Islands.

== Demographics ==
Historical census populations – Little Current (Population centre)

Year	Pop.	±%
1901	728	—
1911	1,208	+65.9%
1921	923	−23.6%
1931	1,101	+19.3%
1941	1,088	−1.2%
1951	1,397	+28.4%
1956	1,514	+8.4%

Year	Pop.	±%
1961	1,527	+0.9%
1966	1,441	−5.6%
1971	1,565	+8.6%
1976	1,476	−5.7%
1981	1,507	+2.1%
1986	1,463	−2.9%
1991	1,511	+3.3%

Year	Pop.	±%
1996	1,575	+4.2%
2001	1,526	−3.1%
2006	1,362	−10.7%
2011	1,523	+11.8%
2016	1,558	+2.3%
2021	1,210	−22.3%

Population counts prior to 1998 are for Little Current (Town).
Source: Statistics Canada

Private dwellings occupied by usual residents (2021): 565 (total dwellings: 728)

Mother tongue (2021):

- English as first language: 93.8%
- French as first language: 2.5%
- English and French as first language: 0.4%
- Other as first language: 2.1%

== Culture ==
Each year the town hosts "Haweater Weekend," a weeklong celebration which takes its name from the Haweaters, the name given to one who is born on Manitoulin Island. The main celebrations take place on the first weekend of August, and include a fireworks display, a video dance, street vendors, and a parade.

The prominent American sportsman John W. Galbreath (1897-1988), owner of the Pittsburgh Pirates Major League Baseball club as well as the Darby Dan Farm Thoroughbred horse racing operation, owned a summer retreat here and named one of his horses after the village. Little Current won the 1974 Preakness and Belmont Stakes and was voted that year's United States Champion 3-Yr-Old Colt.

== Transportation ==
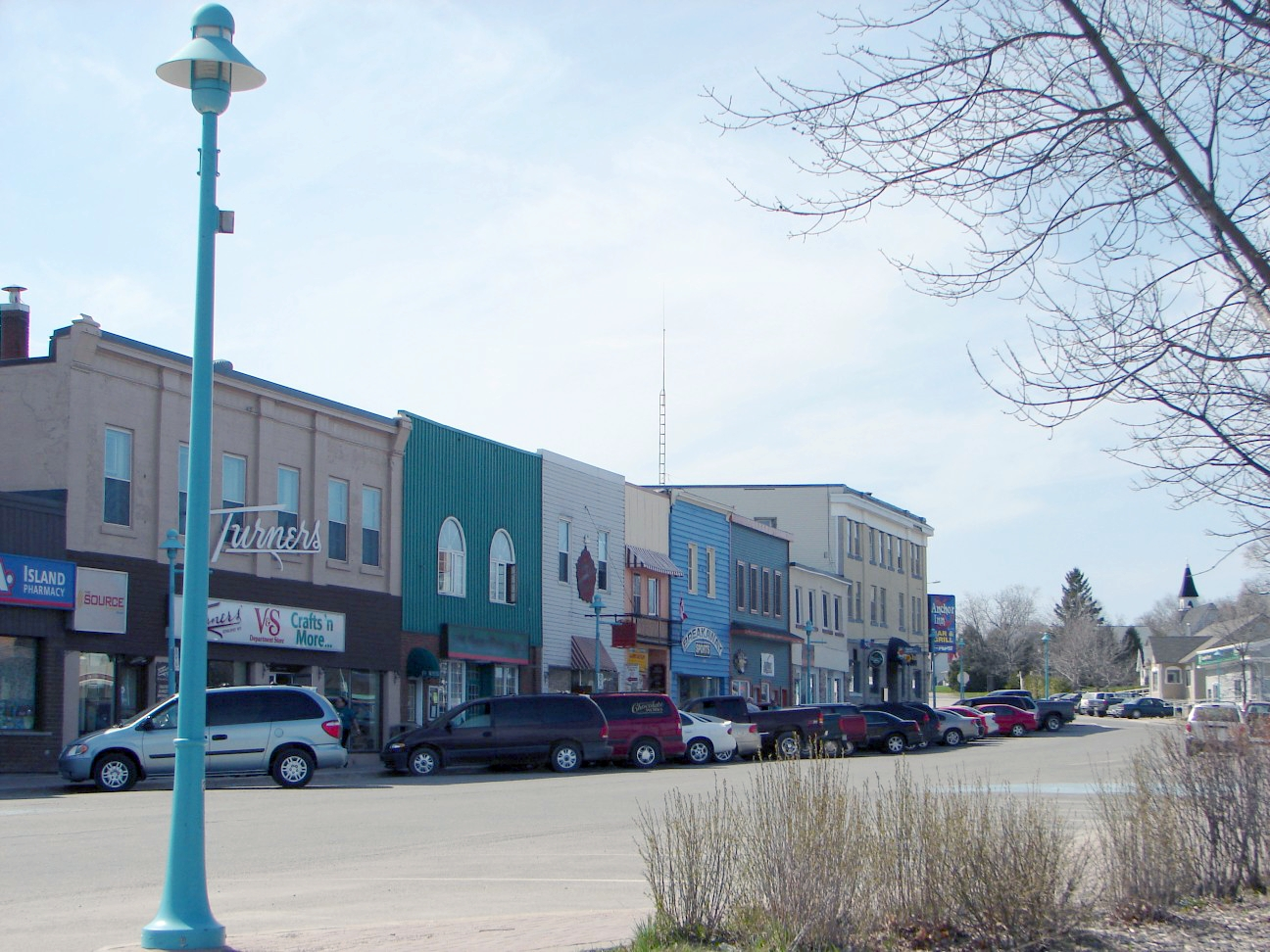
Water Street in Little Current

Except for the seasonal ferry service at South Baymouth, all traffic to and from the island goes through the community, since the only bridge to Manitoulin Island is at Little Current. The Little Current Swing Bridge was built in 1913 as a railroad bridge, and converted to a single lane for automobile traffic. It is designated as an Ontario Heritage Bridge.

Ontario Highway 6 goes through Little Current.

== Media ==
The Manitoulin Expositor is a Canadian weekly newspaper, published in Little Current since 1879.

== Notable people ==
- Danny Cox, ice hockey player
- John Gray, ice hockey player
- Don McCulloch, ice hockey player
- Ganton Scott, ice hockey player
