= Mindemoya =

Mindemoya may refer to:

- the community of Mindemoya in the township of Central Manitoulin, Ontario
- Lake Mindemoya, a lake near the community of Mindemoya
- Treasure Island (Ontario), an island in Lake Mindemoya
- Mindemoya River, a river flowing from Lake Mindemoya
