= Blue Jay Creek (Lake Huron tributary) =

- Location of the mouth of Blue Jay Creek in Ontario

Location
- Country: Canada
- Province: Ontario
- Region: Northeastern Ontario
- District: Manitoulin
- Townships: Tehkummah; Central Manitoulin

Physical characteristics
- Source: Spring
  - location: Central Manitoulin
  - coordinates: 45°42′13″N 81°57′20″W
  - elevation: 275 m (902 ft)
- Mouth: Michael's Bay (Lake Huron)
  - location: Tehkummah
  - coordinates: 45°35′31″N 82°05′33″W
  - elevation: 176 m (577 ft)
- Length: 14 km (8.7 mi)
- Basin size: 74.5 km^{2} (28.8 sq mi)

Basin features
- Tributaries
  - right: Black Creek

Blue Jay Creek is a river on Manitoulin Island in Central Manitoulin and Tehkummah townships, Manitoulin District in northeastern Ontario, Canada, and a tributary of Lake Huron.

== Geography ==
Blue Jay Creek begins at a spring, about 3.4 kilometres (2.1 mi) east of the community of Sandfield on Lake Manitou in Central Manitoulin township, and at an elevation of 275 metres (902 ft). It flows south under Highway 542 and then to the east of the community of Tehkummah in Tehkummah township. The creek heads southwest, takes in the right tributary Black Creek and reaches its mouth at Michael's Bay on Lake Huron, near the community of Michael's Bay, and about 1.2 kilometres (0.7 mi) southeast of the mouth of the Manitou River and 7 kilometres (4 mi) northwest of the community of South Baymouth.

=== Tributaries ===
- Black Creek (right)

== Ecology ==
The Blue Jay Creek and Manitou River Enhancement Strategy was completed in June 2001 and approved in December 2003 by the Manitoulin Streams Improvement Association. The organization has rehabilitated sites on the creek, which has improved water quality and the fisheries in the region.

== Blue Jay Creek Provincial Park ==
Blue Jay Creek Provincial Park
- IUCN category II (national park)
- Interactive map of Blue Jay Creek Provincial Park
- Location: Tehkummah, Ontario, Canada
- Coordinates: 45°35′42″N 82°04′48″W
- Area: 245.70 ha (607.1 acres)
- Designation: Natural environment
- Established: 1997
- Governing body: Ontario Parks
- Website: www.ontarioparks.ca/park/bluejaycreek

Blue Jay Creek Provincial Park is a provincial park in Tehkummah on Manitoulin Island. The L-shaped park is located at the mouth of the Blue Jay Creek on Michael's Bay of Lake Huron.

Blue Jay Creek Provincial Park is notable for its raised beach and swale landforms, which are some of the largest on the island, with upland willow thickets. Its landscape is characterized by cedar, spruce, and pine forests, as well as extensive wetlands with cedar, black spruce, and black ash trees. It is an important deer wintering spot while the Blue Jay Creek itself is an important trout spawning location.

It is a non-operating park, meaning that there are no facilities or services for visitors. The park can be used for canoeing, nature viewing, hunting, and fishing.

The park was created in 1997 as part of the Ministry of Natural Resources' "Keep it Wild" campaign, out of previously private land that was donated to the government in 1989.

== See also ==
- List of rivers of Ontario

== Sources ==
- "Blue Jay Creek". Geographical Names Data Base. Natural Resources Canada.
- "Topographic Map sheets 42G9, 41H12". Atlas of Canada. Natural Resources Canada. 2010-02-04. Archived from the original on 2010-08-03.
