= Vachon River =

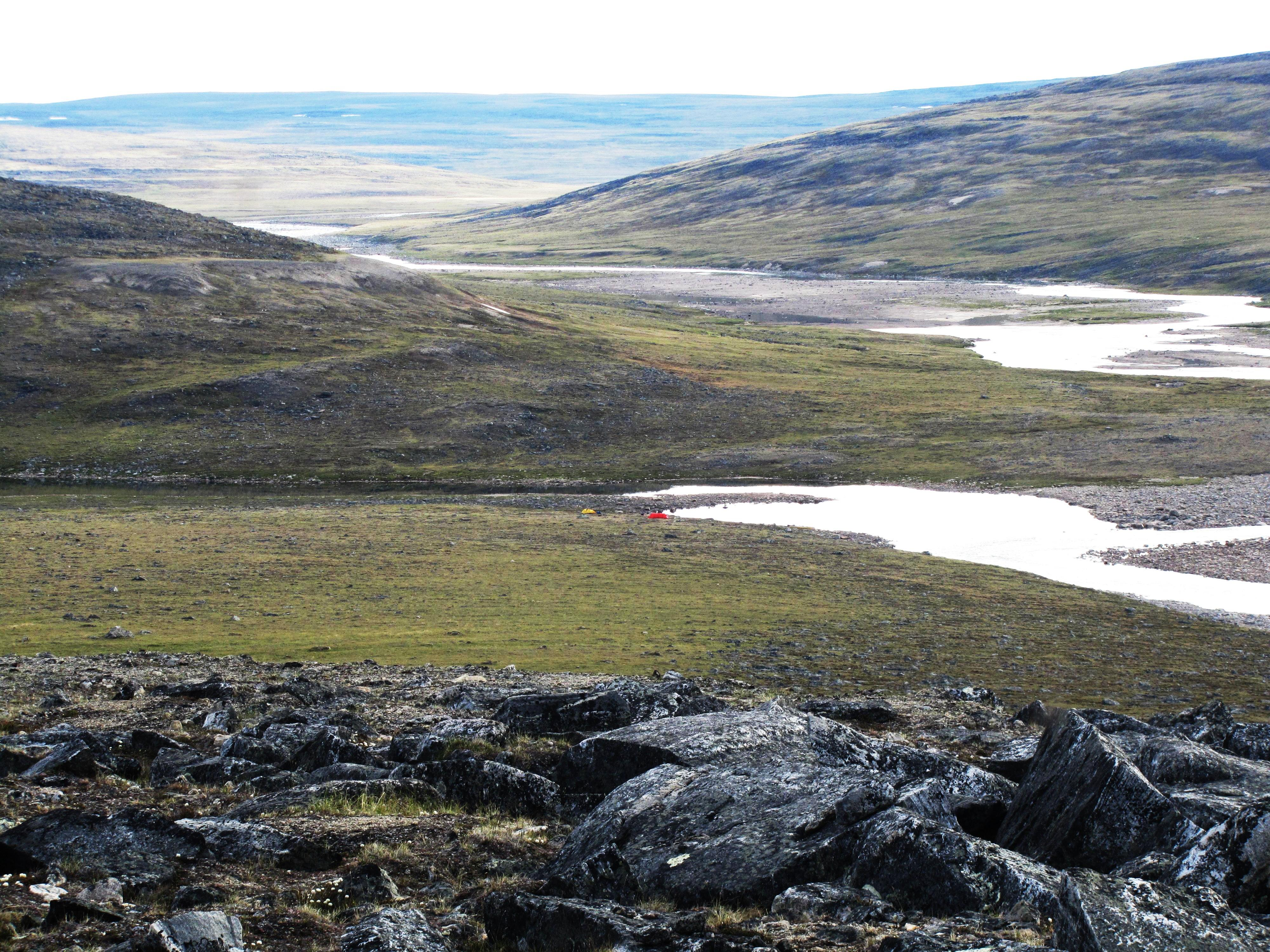

Location
- Country: Canada

Physical characteristics
- Source
  - location: Lac Laflamme (a.k.a. Manarsulik Lake), Nunavik, Quebec
  - elevation: 487.5 m (1,599 ft)
- Mouth
  - location: Arnaud/Payne River
  - elevation: 5 m (16 ft)
- Length: 266 km (165 mi) (measured from north-west end of Lac Laflamme)

Vachon River (French: Rivière Vachon, Inuktitut: Ikkatujaaq (seemingly shallow) or Qarnatulik (unknown meaning) or Avaluko (unknown meaning)) is a river in the Arctic tundra of Nunavik, Quebec. It originates on Lac Laflamme at 61°21′49″N 73°45′36″W just north of Pingualuit crater and finishes at 60°4′43″N 71°8′59″W where it joins Arnaud/Payne River. It was named after bishop Alexander Vachon (1885–1953), rector of Laval University in 1939 and from 1940 to 1953, archbishop of the diocese of Ottawa, Ontario.

Despite the access and paddling difficulties (long rapids and ledges) and extreme climatic conditions, river is occasionally paddled by canoeists:

- in 1978, 4 canoeists from Quebec, Canada, paddled Vachon upstream as access route to Povungnituk River (French: Rivière Puvirnituq);
- in 1985, the group of 4 canoeists (Pascal Dorémus, Jacques Lavoué, Olivier Barbier and Philippe Zanni) from Lyon, France coming from Puvirnituq, upstream Povungnituk River (French: rivière Puvirnituq);
- in 2009, solo canoeist Eric Leclair from Quebec;
- in 2010, the group of 4 canoeists (Lynette Chubb and Lester Kovac from Ontario and Curt Gellerman and Wesley Rusk from the United States).

River is inhabited by an important Arctic char population harvested for subsistence by the Inuit of Kangirsuk.

== See also ==
- Nunavik
- List of rivers of Quebec
