= Manitoulin Streams Improvement Association =

The Manitoulin Streams Improvement Association is a nonprofit group based on Manitoulin Island, Ontario, Canada, that works to rehabilitate the streams, rivers, and creeks on the island, which is the largest lake island in the world. They partner with the entire community, including farmers, fishermen, and local lake and fish associations. Their rehabilitation projects enhance water quality and the fisheries resource on Manitoulin Island and Lake Huron which is fed by the streams. These streams were once very productive for salmon and trout spawning, but have been destroyed by centuries of human land use practices.

Since its formation, Manitoulin Streams Improvement Association has worked to rehabilitate 23 sites along four waterways on Manitoulin Island. These include the Manitou River, Blue Jay Creek, Norton's Creek and Bass Lake Creek. They have also had a class environmental assessment conducted of 184 waterways on Manitoulin Island and identified a top ten priority waterways that need to be rehabilitated. The Blue Jay Creek and Manitou River Enhancement Strategy was completed in June 2001 and approved in December 2003. In 2010, Manitoulin Streams Improvement Association began work on its fifth waterway rehabilitation project, the Mindemoya River. The organization developed and approved an enhancement strategy for the Mindemoya River in 2009.

They installed the first frost free nose pump in Northern Ontario. The nose pump is a cattle watering system that uses a well instead of having the cattle drink from the nearby streams. In 2008, Ontario Minister of Natural Resources, the Honourable Donna Cansfield, toured the Norton's Creek rehabilitation site while Manitoulin Streams was working to restore the creek. The visit was covered by the Ontario Federation of Anglers and Hunters' (OFAH) Ontario Out of Doors magazine.

== Awards ==
- 2008 "Success Story of the Year" award at the Bi National State of The Lakes Ecosystem Conference (SOLEC). The SOLEC award was presented by the U.S. Consul General and Canadian Consul General.
- Ontario Federation of Anglers and Hunters (OFAH) 2009 Zone "D" Conservation Club of the Year Award.
- Ontario Federation of Anglers and Hunters (OFAH) Mary Pickford Trophy. Awarded on March 20, 2010 to Manitoulin Streams for their 2009 rehabilitation work. Named after the late actress the trophy is awarded to 1 of 660 OFAH member clubs that is judged to have achieved the most for conservation over the previous year.
