= Manitou River (Manitoulin Island) =

River on Manitoulin Island, in Ontario, Canada

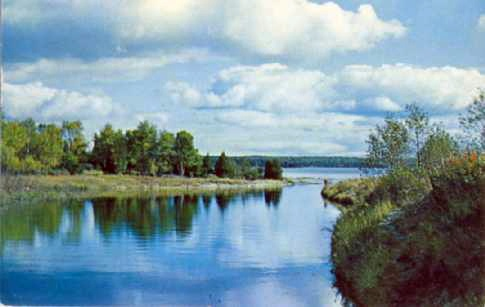

- Location within Ontario

Location
- Country: Canada
- Province: Ontario
- Region: Ontario North
- District: Manitoulin District
- Island: Manitoulin Island

Physical characteristics
- Source: Manitou Lake
  - location: Central Manitoulin township
  - coordinates: 45°42′13″N 81°59′49″W
  - elevation: 222
- Mouth: Lake Huron
  - location: Tehkummah township
  - coordinates: 45°35′59″N 82°06′12″W
  - elevation: 176 metres (577 ft)
- Length: 20.1 kilometres (12.5 mi)

Basin features
- Progression: Lake Huron, Saint Lawrence River
- River system: Saint Lawrence River
- Tributaries
  - left: Discharge of lake Smoky Hollow.
  - right: (upstream) Discharge from a small lake, discharge from a stream (via the lake crossed by the river).
- Waterbodies: Unidentified lake

The Manitou River is a river of the Manitoulin Island, flowing in the township of Central Manitoulin and Tehkummah, in Manitoulin District, in Northern Ontario region, in the province of Ontario, Canada.

Apart from the residential areas, forestry is the main economic activity in this valley; agriculture, second.

== Geography ==
The Manitou River rises at the dam located at the bottom of a bay on the south shore of the eastern part of Manitou Lake at Sandfield in the Township of Central Manitoulin on the Manitoulin Island. This recreational-tourism-oriented lake has an area of 104 km (64.62 mi), a length of 19.8 km (12.3 mi), a width of 6 km (3.7 mi) and an altitude of 222 m (728 ft).

The Manitou River current generally descends southwest over approximately 20.1 kilometres (12.5 mi) in length through the boreal forest (crossing a few agricultural areas in the upper part), with a drop of 46 m (151 ft), according to the following segments:

- 6.2 km (3.9 mi) westward, first passing under the Highway 542 bridge, to a bend in the river where it heads further southwest; then pass under the Case Road bridge; cross the southern part of a little lake (length: 0.4 km (0.25 mi); altitude: 207 m (679 ft)) which receives the discharge (coming from the north) of a stream; cross the south-western part of White lake (altitude: 207 m (679 ft)), up to its mouth;
- 8.4 km (5.2 mi) generally towards the south-west, passing under the Townline Road West bridge (east–west direction) in Snowville hamlet, successively intersecting the Sideroad 20 road (north–south direction), the road Concession Road 2 (east-west), Government Road, to the outlet (from the east) of Smoky Hollow Lake;
- 5.5 km (3.4 mi) winding southward, collecting the discharge (coming from the west) of a small lake, to its mouth.

The Manitou River ends at Michael's Bay on North shore of Lake Huron at the south end of Manitoulin Island.

== Development of the valley ==
The Blue Jay Creek and Manitou River Enhancement Strategy was completed in June 2001 and approved in December 2003 by the Manitoulin Streams Improvement Association. The organization has rehabilitated 17 major sites along the river which has improved water quality and the fisheries in the region.

== Toponymy ==
The toponyms "Manitou Lake" and "Manitou River" are linked. The term "Manitou" derives from the Huron tradition which once had a large population around Lake Huron.

== See also ==
- List of rivers of Ontario
