= Cedar Creek Earthworks Site =

Prehistoric archaeological site in Ontario, Canada

- Type: Earthworks
- Location: Essex County, Ontario, Canada

History
- Built: c. 900
- Abandoned: c. 1350

Site notes
- Excavation dates: 1972, 2013

The Cedar Creek Earthworks Site is an earthworks site located in Essex County, Ontario. It has the Borden number of AaHq-2. This site was originally documented in Canada in the 1930s. This site has gone through several different forms of excavation throughout the years, such as remote sensing, test-pitting, and targeted test excavations. Even with these different forms of excavations and changes that have been made to the site there is still evidence of the sites cultural history.

Evidence of palisades are seen in the ruins of the site. This cultural evidence lead to the further questioning of the original purpose of this site. It is believed that this site may not have been a permanent settlement but instead something entirely different. This site is considered a late Prehistoric earthworks site. Earthworks sites are often discovered as a combination of dirt mounds and topographic changes or discrepancies compared to their surrounding areas. Several pottery remnants of pottery were found on the site.

== Discovery of the site ==
Cedar Creek Earthworks site was initially recorded by George F. MacDonald in 1936. MacDonald sketched a map of the site including details of the surrounding marsh, two large nodes, two pits, and trees. Later on in 1949, Thomas Lee recorded the site as well. During this time excavations were not permitted but photography was, in the photograph that Lee contributes to this site the Node A that MacDonald discussed is not present. In MacDonald's records of the site he was more focused on the nodes on the northern part of the site while i Lees studies he was more focused on the two nodes on the southern end of the site. It was not until around 1970 that the first excavations took place. During the 1970s, more post-modernism was seen with the way archaeologist were studying sites. The form of new archaeology led the researches excavating to utilize the site not only to assess what people might have done in the past but also what the overall culture and purpose of the site was.

== Excavations and artifacts ==
Dean Knight and Peter Ramsden were the first researchers to excavate the site around 1972. These archaeologists began their excavations by digging several test trenches. Their excavation only found flakes and a small amount of pottery shards. In 2013 more excavations took place. These utilized several different excavation techniques, such as a magnetometer to create a geophysical survey, this method was then followed with shovel test pitting in different areas in hopes to find additional artifacts. There were 121 test pits dug and only 11 of those pits produced cultural materials which were limited to fire-cracked rock, and potsherds. Of the artifacts uncovered there was mainly broken ceramics and fire-cracked rock, there was one spearhead found, and some ground stone tools. Since the site had poor preservation conditions the ceramics found were eroded and not fully intact. There was evidence of designs on the partial ceramics that were found.

== Suspected use of site ==
Due to the poor preservation environment archaeologists have had a hard time determining the history of the site due to the lack of observable artifacts. Since there were not many artifacts to date the age of the site, archaeologists utilized the surrounding earthworks sites to give an estimated inhabitation date. Based on the surrounding sites the expected date of inhabitant was sometime between 900 and 1350 A.D.. Since there was not an abundance of artifacts found on the site, archaeologists believe that the site was not a long term residence but maybe used seasonally or ritually
