= Hammer of Thor (monument) =

Human-made stone monument in Canada

Coordinates: 60°0′14″N 70°26′10″W

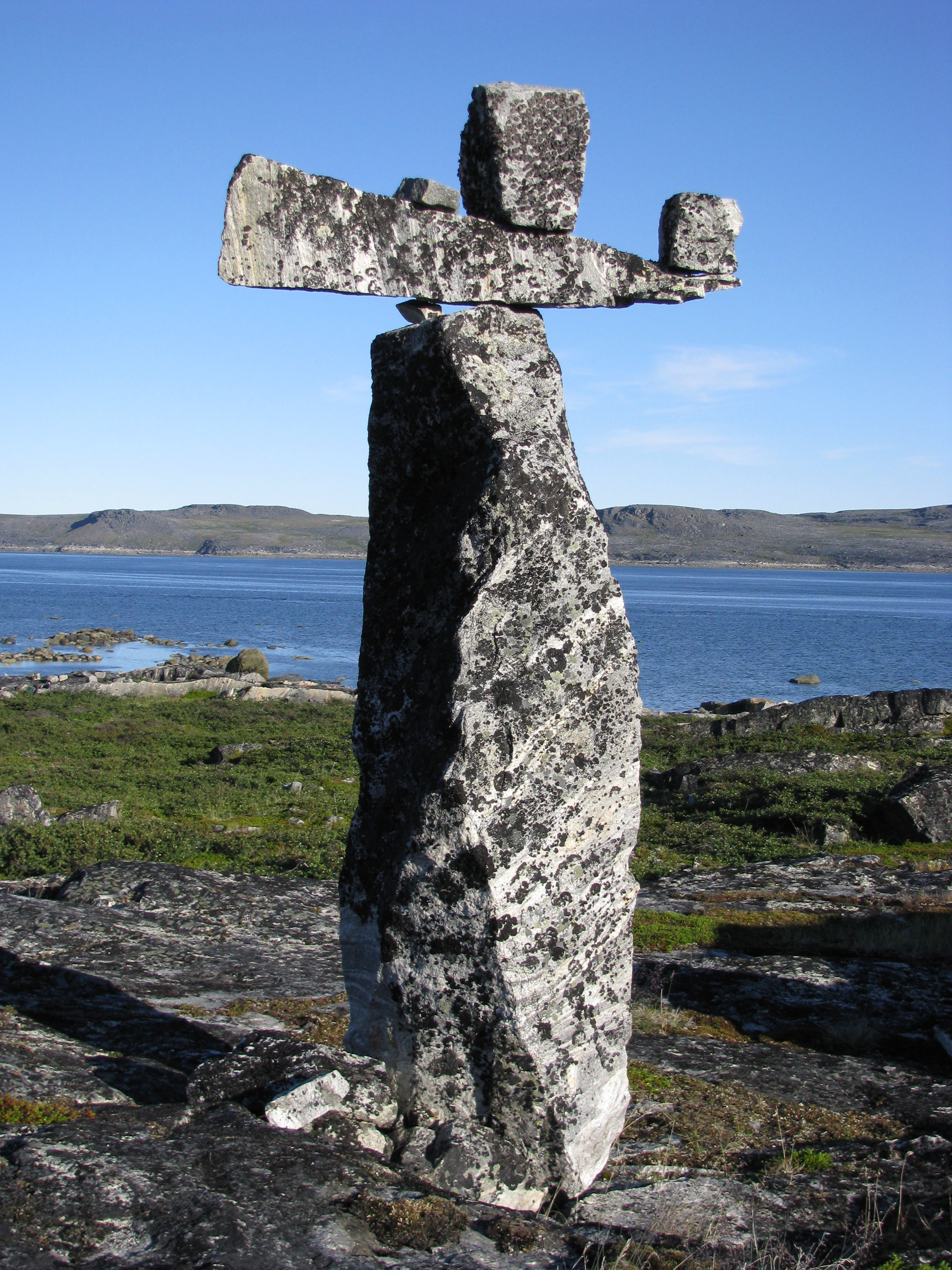
The Hammer of Thor monument

A silhouette showing the approximate size and shape of the monument.

The Hammer of Thor is a 3.3 metres (10.8 ft) tall, t-shaped, man-made rock formation called an inuksuk located along the Arnaud River in the Ungava Peninsula, Quebec, Canada. It was discovered in 1964 by an archaeologist who thought it was erected by Vikings. Far more likely is that it is part of the long inuksuk building traditions of the Dorset culture and related groups, rather than being constructed by Norse colonists.

== Description ==
The Hammer of Thor consists of three rocks stacked on top of each other—a vertical shaft, a cross piece, and a capstone. The vertical column, or shaft, measures about 8 feet (2.44 m) tall; the cross piece is about 4.5 feet (1.37 m) long; and the capstone is 14 inches (35.56 cm) in height. The entire monument stands about 3.3 metres (10.8 ft) high; and has been estimated to weigh about 4,000 pounds (1,800 kg).

It is located on the northern bank of the Arnaud River (formerly known as Payne River), about 15 miles (24.1 km) above Payne Bay and 16 miles (25 km) west of Kangirsuk village, near the western coast of Ungava Bay, in the Ungava Peninsula, Quebec, Canada.

== Discovery ==
The monument was discovered in 1964 by archaeologist Thomas E. Lee, during an anthropological expedition to Ungava. It had been standing for many years, and no one in the area knew who had erected it. Inuit tradition held that it predated their arrival in the area. Lee considered it to be European in appearance, and considered it to be proof that the Norse inhabited the Ungava region about a thousand years before. Lee thought it looked like a hammer and named the monument "The Hammer of Thor".

== See also ==
- Inuksuk - a man-made stone landmark or cairn, used by the Inuit, Inupiat, Kalaallit, Yupik, and other peoples of the Arctic region of North America, from Alaska to Greenland.
