= Kagawong River =

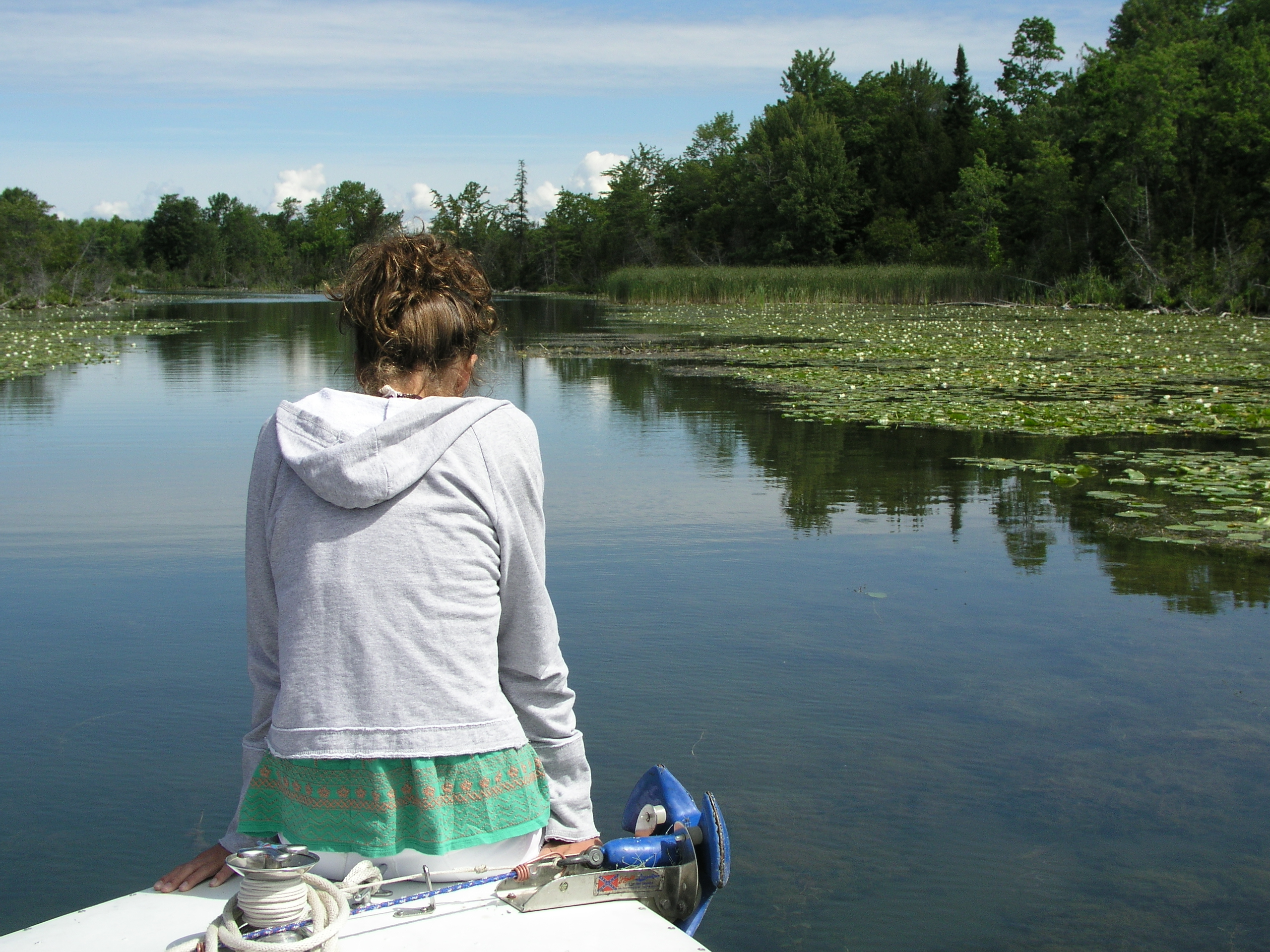
- A view of part of the Kagawong River
- Etymology: "Mists rising from falling water" in Ojibwe

Location
- Country: Canada
- Province: Ontario
- District: Manitoulin District

Physical characteristics
- Source: Lake Kagawong
  - coordinates: 45°53′23″N 82°16′23″W
  - elevation: 210 m (690 ft)
- Mouth: Mudge Bay, North Channel Lake Huron
  - coordinates: 45°54′36″N 82°15′23″W
  - elevation: 176 m (577 ft)
- Length: 3.3 km (2.1 mi)

The Kagawong River is a river on Manitoulin Island in Manitoulin District, Ontario, Canada which flows from Lake Kagawong to empty into Mudge Bay on the North Channel Lake Huron. The river falls over a limestone bluff at Bridal Veil Falls. "Kagawong" means "mists rising from falling water" in the Ojibwe language.

The Kagawong River consists of two parts. The first, at the level of Lake Kagawong, flows in an easterly direction out of the Lake reaching and passes under Highway 540 just above Bridal Veil Falls. The river is navigable by canoe, kayak, paddleboat and other shallow draft boats.

The lower Kagawong River below Bridal Veil Falls is fast flowing and shallow, and is therefore not navigable by boat. However, a viewing platform and a riverside walk give visual access to the Falls and provide a river walk down to the downtown area of Kagawong, and the harbour.

In late September – mid October, there is a salmon run.

== See also ==
- List of rivers of Ontario
