= Sheguiandah =

- Location within Ontario
- 45.91°N 81.925°W
- Periods: Paleo-Indian; Archaic; Woodland
- Location: Manitoulin Island, Ontario, Canada

Site notes
- Archaeologists: Thomas E. Lee
- Discovered: 1951

National Historic Site of Canada
- Official name: Sheguiandah National Historic Site of Canada
- Designated: 1954

Sheguiandah is an archaeological site and National Historic Site of Canada. It is located on the northwestern shore of Manitoulin Island in Manitoulin District, Ontario. The site has remains from 9000 years of occupation, from the Paleo-Indian period through the Archaic period until the Middle Woodland period. Throughout this time, the people of the area travelled to the site to quarry from its quartzite outcroppings for use in toolmaking.

It was originally discovered in 1951 by Thomas E. Lee, who found artifacts in surface collections indicating the site was ancient. He led excavation teams for the next four years. Based on the artifacts they found, he estimated the earliest occupation date of about 30,000 years BP. He noted there were Paleo-Indian and Archaic artifacts, primarily scrapers and blades, dating to about 12,000 BP. Public interest in the finds contributed to passage of legislation in 1953 to protect archeological sites in Ontario. The site was designated as a National Historic Site of Canada in 1954. It was listed on the Canadian Register of Historic Places in 2009.

The ancestors of Native American populations from the tip of Chile in the south to Canada in the north, migrated from Asia in at least three waves.

The site was studied later by other teams of specialists. In 1992 archeologist Peter L. Storck and archeologist Patrick Julig led a team doing additional excavations. Drawing on new material from botany and related disciplines, they concluded that a more conservative estimate of age was justified, and estimated the site was almost certainly occupied 9,500 years BP by Paleo-Indians, making it still highly significant in North American archaeology and the archaeology of Ontario. They said that more research needed to be done.
