= Manitoulin Island =

Island in Lake Huron, Ontario, Canada

Native name: Ojibwe: ᒪᓂᑝᐙᓕᓐᒃ, Manidoowaaling
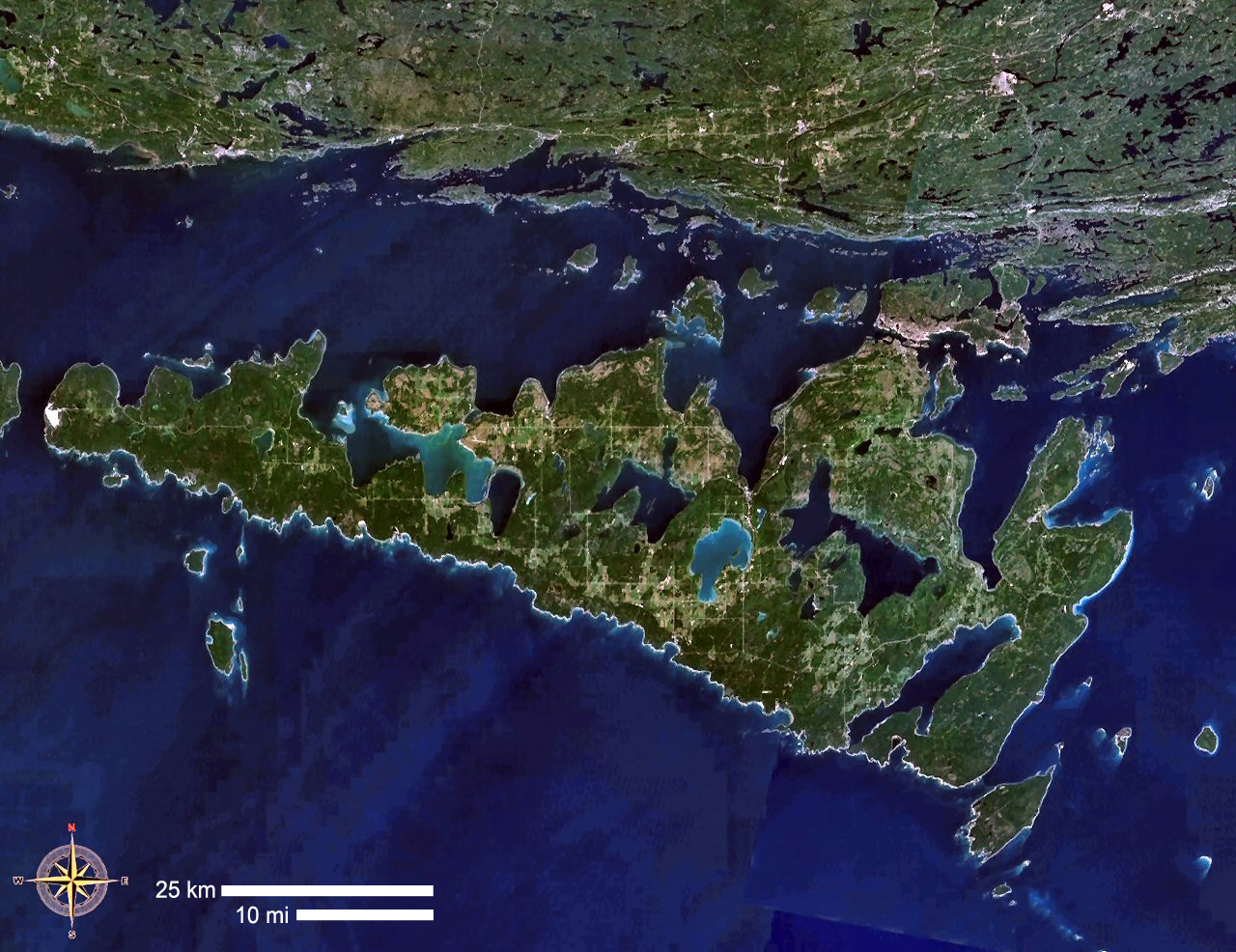
- Satellite image of Manitoulin Island

Geography
- Location: Lake Huron
- Coordinates: 45°46′N 82°12′W
- Area: 2,766 km^{2} (1,068 sq mi) (2005)
- Area rank: 32nd in Canada & 174th worldwide
- Highest elevation: 352 m (1155 ft)
- Highest point: The Cup and Saucer

Administration
- Canada
- Province: Ontario
- District: Manitoulin District
- Largest settlement: Little Current

Demographics
- Population: 13,255 (2016)
- Pop. density: 4.56/km^{2} (11.81/sq mi)

Manitoulin Island (/ˌmænəˈtuːlɪn/ MAN-ə-TOO-lin) is an island in Lake Huron, located within the borders of the Canadian province of Ontario. With an area of 2,766 km^{2} (1,068 sq mi), it is the largest lake island in the world, the 32nd largest island in Canada and the 174th worldwide. It is large enough that it has over 100 lakes itself. In addition to the historic Anishinaabe and European settlement of the island, archaeological discoveries at Sheguiandah have demonstrated Paleo-Indian and Archaic cultures dating from 10,000 BC to 2,000 BC. The current name of the island is the English version, via French, of the Ottawa or Ojibwe name Manidoowaaling (ᒪᓂᑝᐙᓕᓐᒃ), which means "cave of the spirit". It was named for an underwater cave where a powerful spirit is said to live. By the 19th century, the Odawa "l" was pronounced as "n". The same word with a newer pronunciation is used for the town Manitowaning (19th-century Odawa "Manidoowaaning"), which is located on Manitoulin Island near the underwater cave where legend has it that the spirit dwells. The modern Odawa name for Manitoulin Island is Mnidoo Mnising, meaning "Spirit Island". Manitoulin Island contains a number of lakes of its own. In order of size, its three most prominent lakes are Lake Manitou, Lake Kagawong and Lake Mindemoya. These three lakes in turn have islands within them, the largest of these being Lake Mindemoya's 33-hectare (82-acre) Treasure Island, located in the centre of Mindemoya.

== Geography and geology ==
The island has an area of 2,766 km^{2} (1,068 sq mi), making it the largest freshwater island in the world, the 174th largest island in the world and Canada's 31st largest island. The island separates the larger part of Lake Huron to its south and west from Georgian Bay to its east and the North Channel to the north. Manitoulin Island itself has 108 freshwater lakes, some of which have their own islands. Lake Manitou, at 104 km^{2} (40 sq mi), is the largest lake in a freshwater island in the world, and Treasure Island in Lake Mindemoya is the largest island in a lake on an island in a lake in the world. Motors are prohibited on boats on Nameless Lake. The island also has four major rivers: the Kagawong, Manitou River, Blue Jay Creek in Michael's Bay and Mindemoya rivers, which provide spawning grounds for salmon and trout. The Manitoulin Streams Improvement Association was formed in 2000 and incorporated in 2007. The organization rehabilitates streams, rivers and creeks on Manitoulin Island to improve water quality and the fisheries resource. The Manitoulin Streams Improvement Association has conducted enhancement strategies for the Manitou River and Blue Jay Creek. The association has rehabilitated 17 major sites on the Manitou River and three major sites on Blue Jay Creek; it has completed work on Bass Lake Creek and Norton's Creek. The organization plans to start work on the Mindemoya River in 2010. Although culturally and politically considered part of Northern Ontario, the island is physiographically part of Southern Ontario, an "eastward extension of the Interior Plains, a region characterized by low relief and sedimentary underpinnings". The island consists mainly of dolomite as it is a continuation of the Bruce Peninsula and Niagara Escarpment. This geological rock formation runs south into Niagara Falls and continues into New York. The "Cup and Saucer Trail", which climbs the escarpment, provides a lookout over the island.

=== Climate ===
Manitoulin Island experiences a humid continental climate (Dfb) with moderation from Lake Huron. The island experiences warm summers and cold winters. Manitoulin Island has a comparable climate to that of Hokkaido (hemiboreal/boreal climate), despite having a lower latitude compared to other boreal areas. The island is characterized by long stretches of marked seasonal differences.

== Culture ==
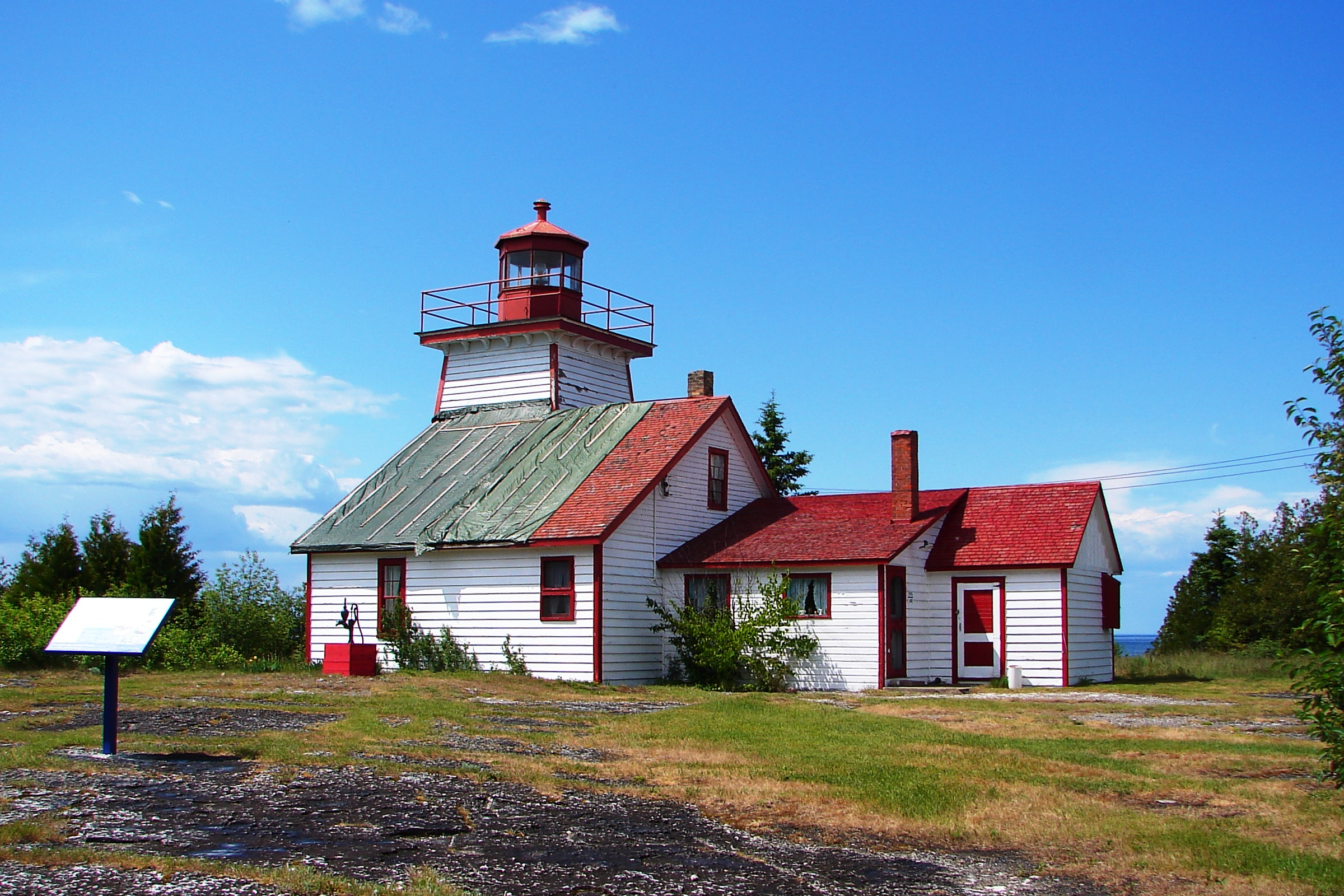
Mississagi Strait Lighthouse on Manitoulin Island

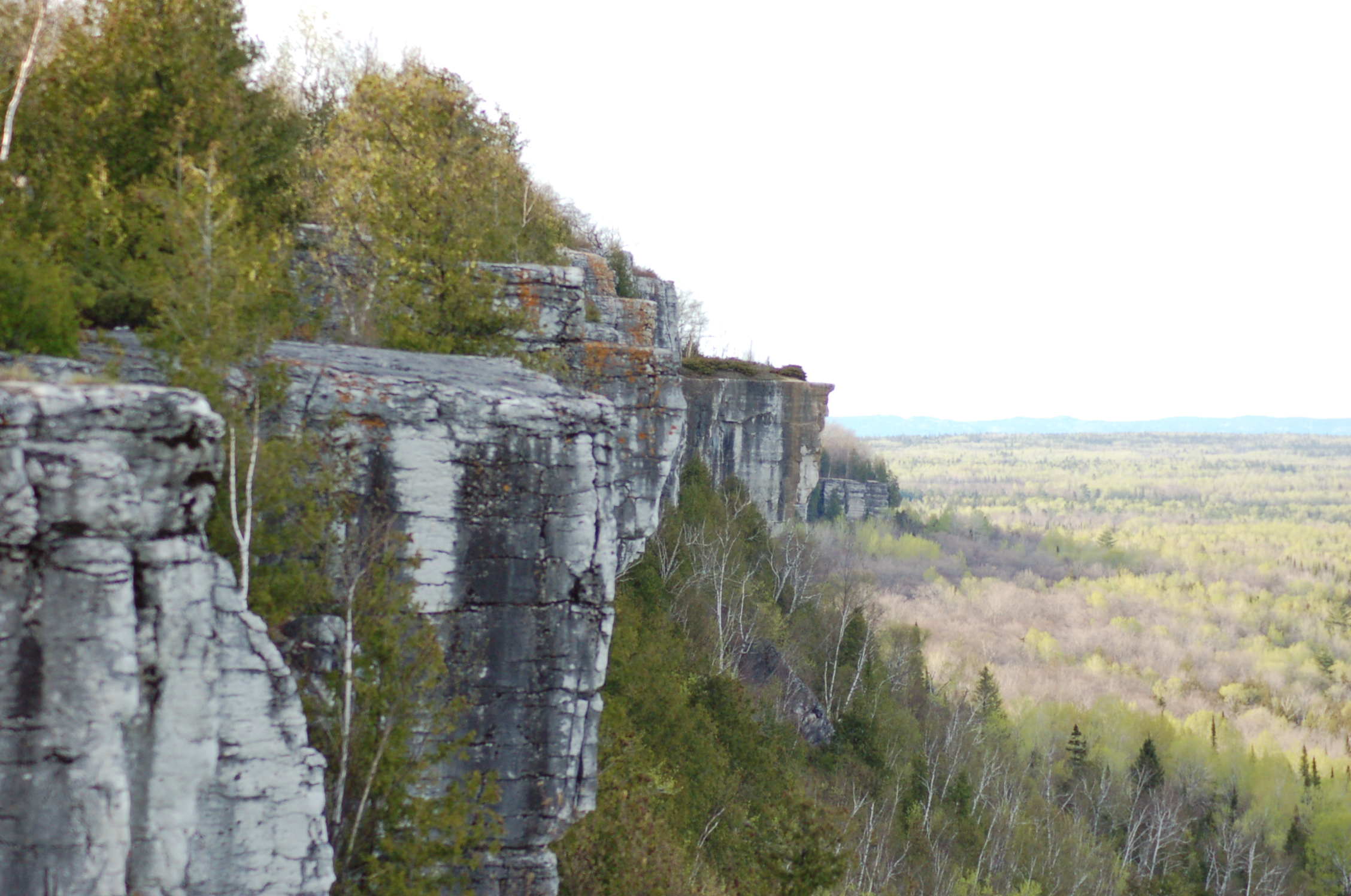
View from the Cup and Saucer Hiking Trail

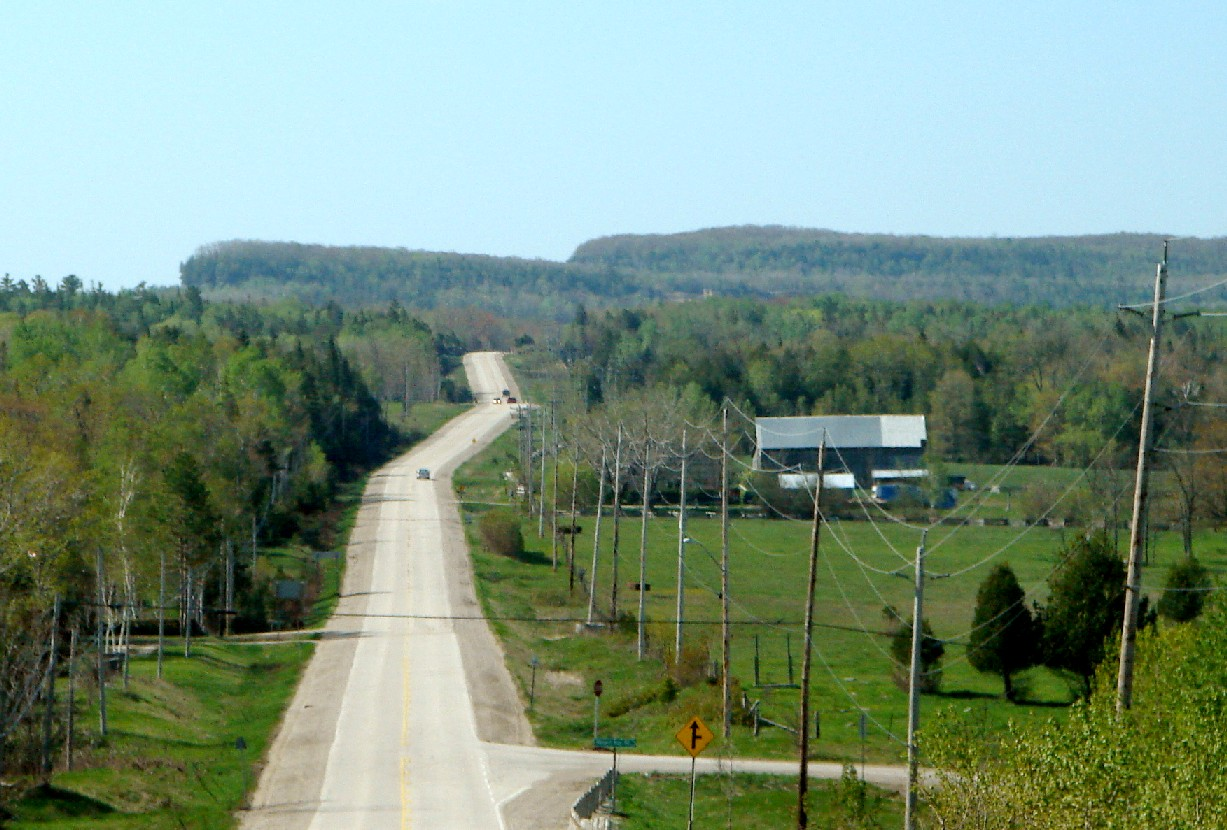
Rural countryside

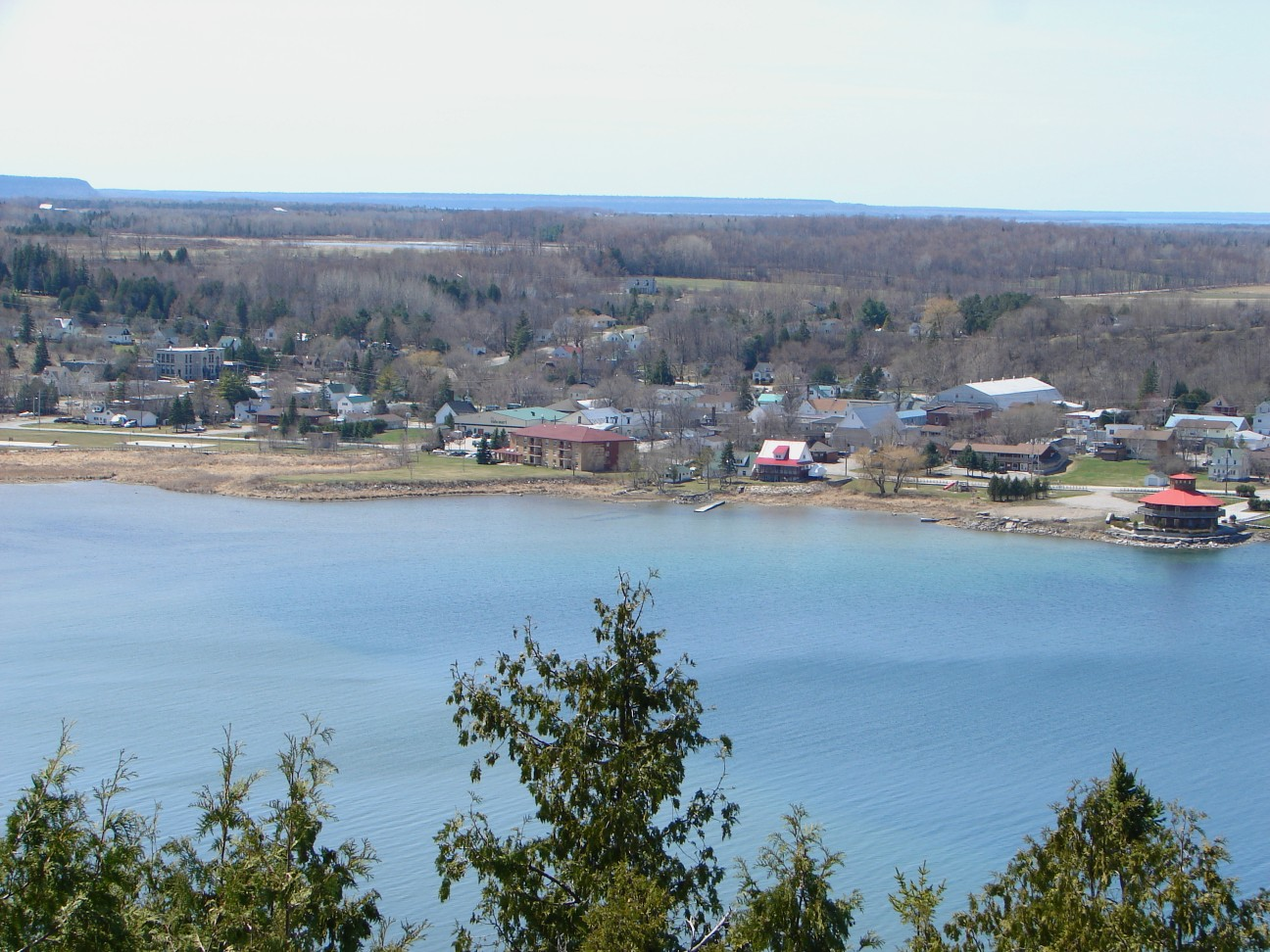
Gore Bay

The island has two incorporated towns (Northeastern Manitoulin and the Islands and Gore Bay), eight townships (Assiginack, Billings, Burpee and Mills, Central Manitoulin, Dawson, Gordon/Barrie Island, Robinson and Tehkummah) and six Anishinaabe reserves (M'Chigeeng, Sheguiandah, Sheshegwaning, Aundeck Omni Kaning, Wiikwemkoong and Zhiibaahaasing). During the summer, the population (12,600 permanent residents) on the island grows by more than a quarter due to tourists coming for boating and other activities in scenic surroundings. The island, along with several smaller neighbouring islands, constitutes the Manitoulin District census division of Ontario. Manitoulin Island's soil is relatively alkaline, which precludes the growth of common Northern Ontario flora such as blueberries, but allows for the island's trademark hawberries. These berries are so distinctive that people born on the island are referred to as "Haweaters". Each year on the August long weekend, the island hosts the Haweater Festival. The festival attracts numerous tourists; it features parades, firework shows, craft shows, and rural competitions such as horse pulls.

== Transportation ==
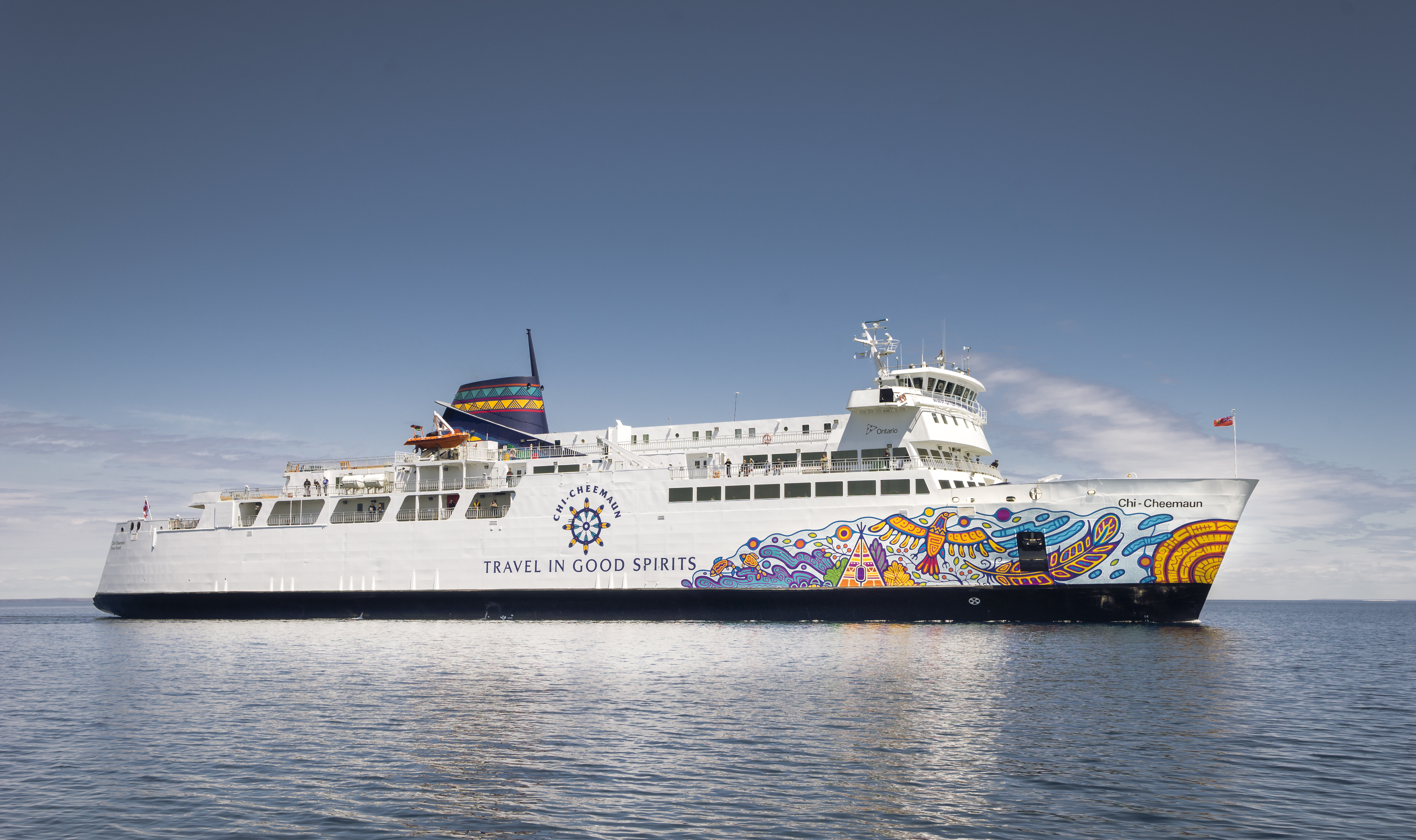
MS Chi-Cheemaun passenger/vehicle ferry

Year-round motor-vehicle access to the island is available via the one-lane Little Current Swing Bridge, which crosses the North Channel at Little Current. From late May to early October, a daily passenger-vehicle ferry, the MS Chi-Cheemaun (Ojibwe for "Big Canoe"), travels between Tobermory on the tip of the Bruce Peninsula and South Baymouth. Winter ice prevents ferry service during that season. There are two airports on the island, Gore Bay-Manitoulin Airport and Manitoulin East Municipal Airport, the latter of which opened in 1988. Both allow small planes access to the island and Border Patrol clearance.

== Demographics ==
Historical population
| Year | Pop. | ±% |
|---|---|---|
| 1871 | 2,231 | — |
| 1881 | 8,460 | +279.2% |
| 1891 | 10,794 | +27.6% |
| 1901 | 11,828 | +9.6% |
| 1911 | 11,324 | −4.3% |
| 1921 | 10,468 | −7.6% |
| 1931 | 10,734 | +2.5% |
| 1941 | 10,841 | +1.0% |

As of 2016, the population was 13,255. Ethnic groups

- 59% White (European-Canadian)
- 40.6% Aboriginal (First Nations)
- 0.4% Black (African-Canadian)

Religious groups

- 42.3% Protestant
- 37.3% Roman Catholic
- 2.7% other Christian
- 17.7% other/none

The most common first languages on Manitoulin Island in 2016 were English (80.8%), Ojibwe (11.2%), French (2.8%), German (0.8%), and Odawa (0.8%).

== History ==
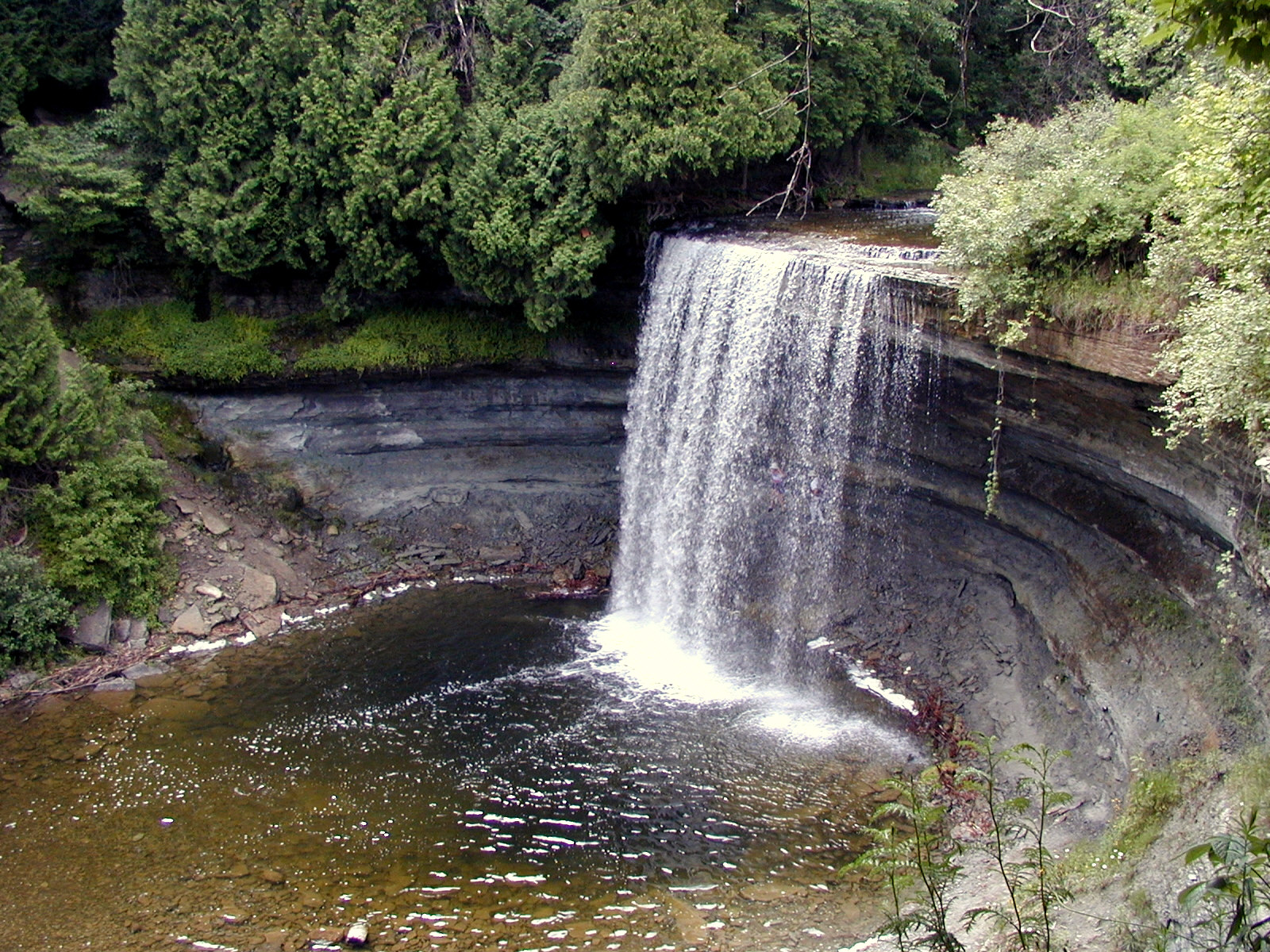
Bridal Veil Falls

In 1952 archaeologist Thomas E. Lee discovered Sheguiandah on the island, a prehistoric site. During excavation, he found artefacts of the Paleo-Indian and Archaic periods, dating at least to 10,000 BC and possibly to 30,000 years ago. Additional studies were undertaken by a team he led from the National Museum of Canada in succeeding years. Popular interest in the finds was so high that it contributed to Ontario's passing legislation in 1953 to protect its archaeological sites. A team performed excavations again in the early 1990s, applying new methods of analysis from botany and other scientific disciplines. They concluded the site was at least 9500 years old, making it one of the most significant in Ontario. Manitoulin means spirit island in Anishinaabemowin (Ojibwe language). The island is considered sacred by the Native Anishinaabe people, who identify as the "People of the Three Fires." This loose confederation is made up of the Ojibwe, Odawa and Potawatomi tribes. The North Channel was part of the route used by the French colonial voyageurs and coureurs des bois to reach Lake Superior. The first known European to settle on the island was Father Joseph Poncet, a French Jesuit, who set up a mission near Wiikwemkoong in 1648. The Jesuits called the island "Isle de Ste-Marie". In addition, the Five Nations of the Iroquois began raiding the island and area to try to control the fur trade with the French. As part of what was called the Beaver Wars, the Iroquois drove the Anishinaabe people from the island by 1650. According to Anishinaabe oral tradition, to purify the island from disease, the people burned their settlements as they left. The island was mostly uninhabited for nearly 150 years. Native people (Odawa, Ojibwe, Potawatomi) began to return to the island following the War of 1812 between Britain and the United States. They ceded the island to the British Crown in 1836; the government set aside the land as a refuge for Natives. In 1838 Jean-Baptiste Proulx re-established a Roman Catholic mission. The Jesuits took over the mission in 1845. In 1862, the government opened up the island to settlement by non-Native people by the Manitoulin Island treaty. The Wikwemikong First Nation claims they did not accept this treaty. The province erected an Ontario Historical Plaque on the grounds of the Assiginack Museum to commemorate the Manitoulin Treaties' role in Ontario's history.

== Notable residents ==
- Carl Beam, Canadian artist of Native ancestry
- Kevin Closs, independent rock recording artist raised in Manitowaning
- Jeannette Corbiere Lavell, Indigenous women's rights activist, founder of the Ontario Native Women's Association
- Ethel Rogers Mulvany, Canadian social worker and teacher
- Daphne Odjig, artist, born and raised on the Wiikwemkoong First Nation
- Isabel Paterson, Canadian-American writer born on Manitoulin Island
- Autumn Peltier, global Indigenous rights and water activist, water protector, top finalist for 2022 International Children's Peace Prize
- Crystal Shawanda, country music artist from Wiikwemkoong
- Lucky Thompson, American jazz saxophone player
