= Bridal Veil Falls (Manitoulin Island) =

Waterfall in Ontario, Canada

Coordinates: 45°54′02″N 82°15′20″W

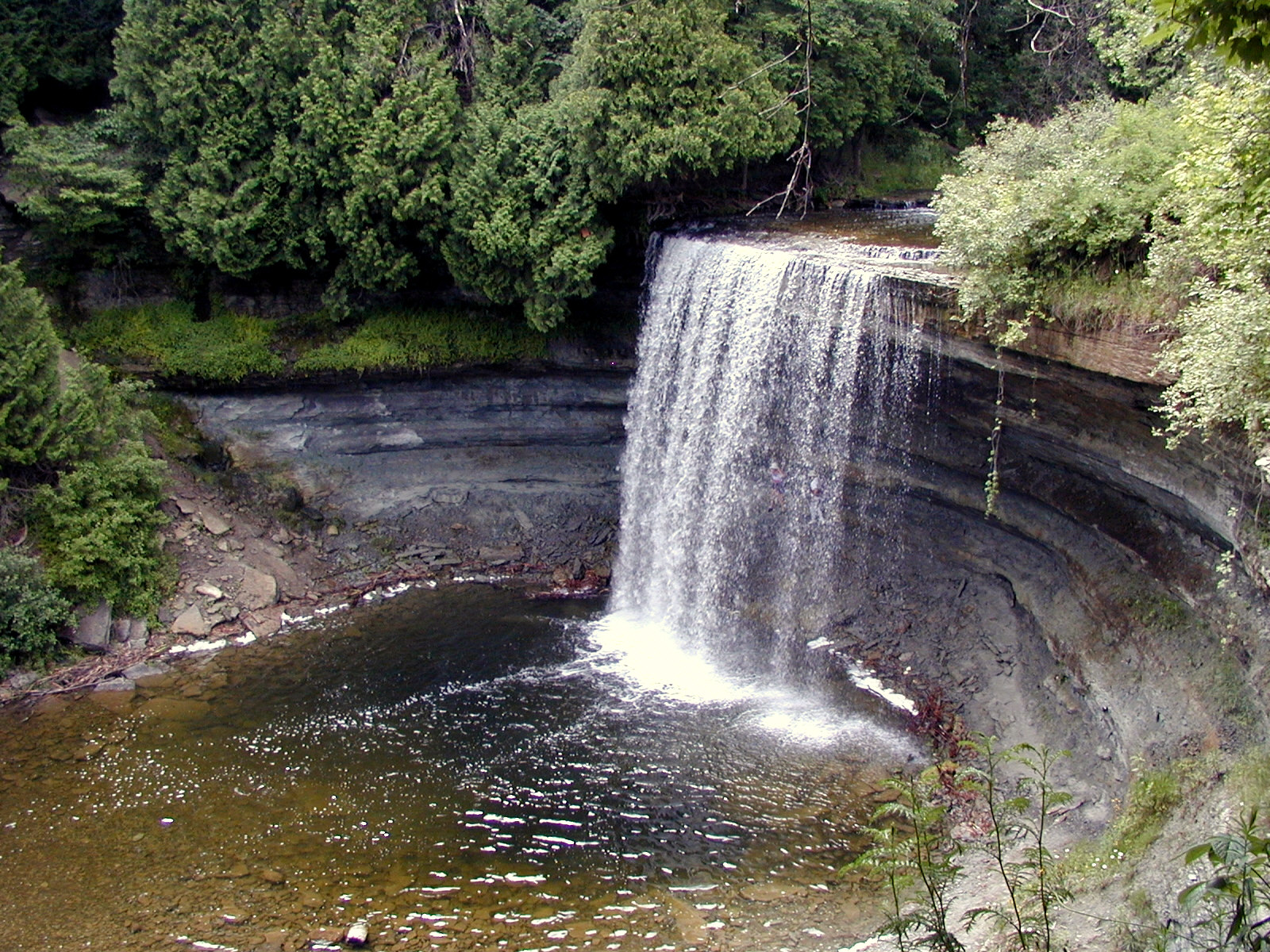
Side view of the larger waterfall, from the upper lookout on the staircase

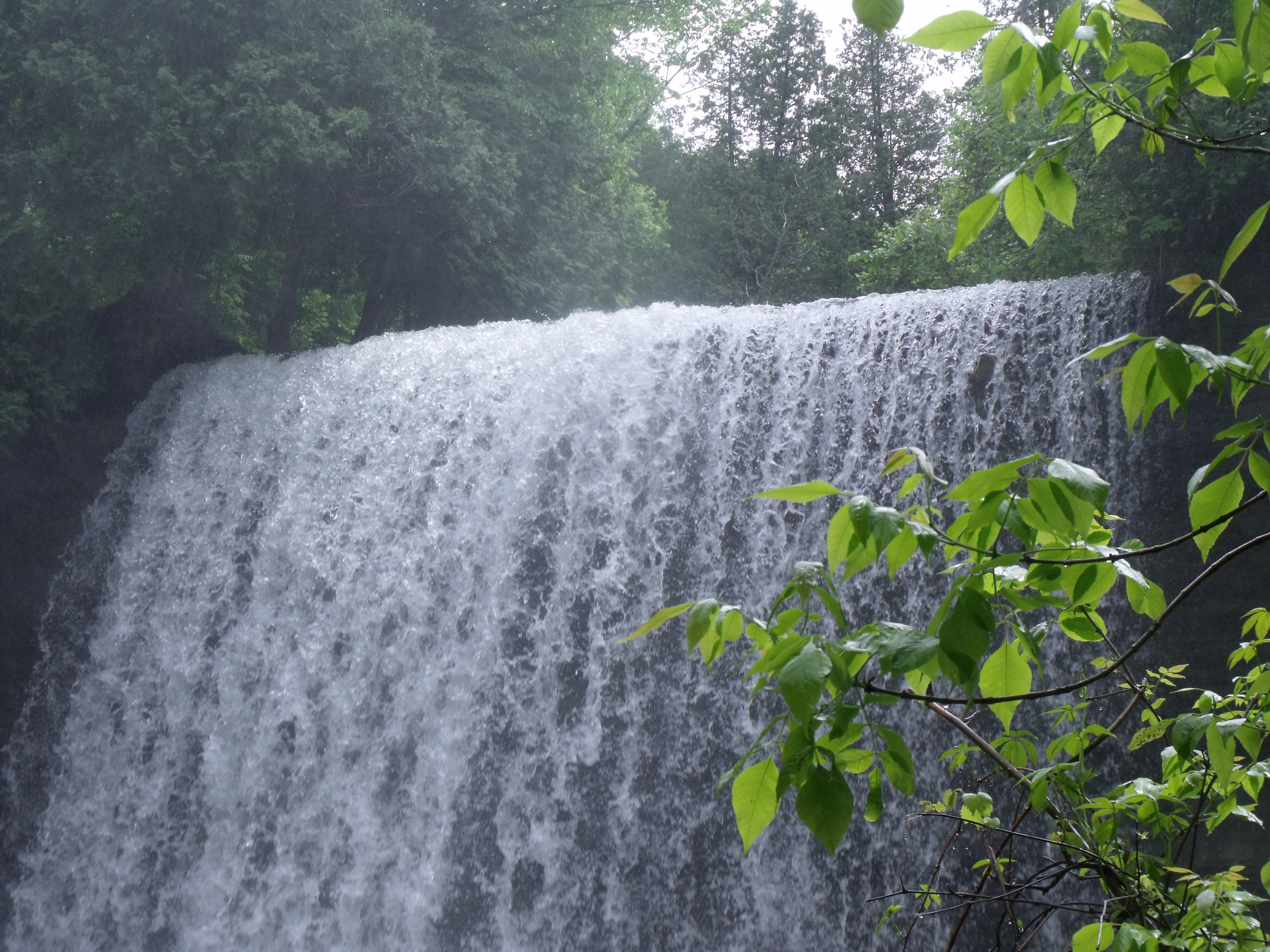
Top of the larger waterfall, viewed from the lookout point at the bottom

Bridal Veil Falls is a waterfall near the town of Kagawong on Lake Huron's Manitoulin Island, Ontario, Canada. The water source is the Kagawong River, which flows from Lake Kagawong to the North Channel of Lake Huron.

It has a height of approximately 11 metres (36 ft). There is a short hiking trail from the falls down to the North Channel.

There are two parking lots and two approaches to the falls: one from the top of the outdoor steel staircase next to the falls, and another from a few hundred metres down the trail, past some of the rapids. Both are easily accessible from Highway 540.

== See also ==
- List of waterfalls
- List of waterfalls in Canada
