= Lake Kagawong =

Lake in Ontario, Canada

- Sunrise

- Location within Canada Location within Ontario
- Location: Manitoulin Island, Ontario
- Coordinates: 45.833344°N 82.309914°W
- Primary outflows: Kagawong River
- Basin countries: Canada
- Surface area: 13,728 acres (55.56 km^{2})
- Max. depth: 45 m (148 ft)
- Surface elevation: 213 m (699 ft)
- Frozen: December - early May
- Islands: Kakawaie Is, Gull Is, Little Is, Bass Is.
- Settlements: Kagawong, Long Bay

Lake Kagawong is the second largest lake on Manitoulin Island in Ontario, Canada. Located in the central part of the island, the lake is drained by the Kagawong River, which falls over Bridal Veil Falls into Lake Huron. Kagawong means "[where mists rise] from the falling [waters]" in the local Ojibwe language.

Lake Kagawong has moderately deep (10-15 meter average) clear-green water, with vertical visibility of 5–6 meters.

Located centrally in Lake Kagawong is an archipelago, consisting of the mile-long (1.6 km) Kakawaie Island, and the much smaller Little Island and Gull Island. There is also an unnamed submerged island that is part of this group. Two miles (3.2 km) north of Kakawaie Island is the solitary Bass Island. All of the islands are uninhabited. Occasionally, large mammals such as deer will be seen on the large island. It is assumed that these animals find their way onto the island during the winter months when the lake is frozen, and are stranded there upon the breakup of the ice.

Most of Lake Kagawong is navigable by recreational and fishing boats, though there are several hazards to navigation. Most notable are the previously mentioned submerged island (located 200 yards (178 m) directly east of Kakawaie Island), the shoals of Kerr's Point and Ednie's Point, and the shallow bays Mud Bay and Prior's Bay. However, few areas have claimed more boaters' propellers than the eastern submerged extension of Twin Harbours. This peninsula of suitcase-sized boulders rises very fast from the 20-meter-deep waters of southern Lake Kagawong. Its location at the entrance to the bay that is home to the government boat ramp and that further enhances its reputation as Lake Kagawong's primary hazard to navigation.

The deepest areas of the lake are, ironically, very close to shore. The easternmost shore of Lake Kagawong consists of a sheer rocky ledge. This ledge can be as low as 1–2 meters, but rises up to 15 meters at Red Rock. The cliffs of Red Rock rise from water that is in excess of 40 meters deep. Care should be taken when boating next to these cliffs, as rockfalls are frequent.

Fishing remains Lake Kagawong's primary attraction over the years. Various species have obtained dominance in popularity. In the early 1900s, smallmouth bass and northern pike were caught in great numbers. Photos exist of proud fishermen displaying catches of nearly 100 bass and pike taken in a single outing. In the 1950s and 60s, whitefish were fished commercially on the lake (although the whitefish population is essentially extinct in the lake today). Throughout the 1970s, 80s, and 90s, yellow perch and smallmouth bass have been the primary target of anglers. Today, there is a controversial effort to stock the lake with yellow walleye. Many fishermen are blaming the walleye stocking effort for the recent decline in yellow perch catches. However, both fishing pressure and the recent arrival of fish-eating cormorants certainly share some of the blame. Other fish occasionally caught on Lake Kagawong are rock bass, pumpkinseed, and catfish.

== See also ==
- List of lakes in Ontario
- Recursive islands and lakes
