= Payne Lake (Quebec) =

Lake in Quebec, Canada

- Lac Payne
- Tasirruaq (Inuktitut)
- Location in Quebec Payne Lake (Canada)
- Location: Kativik, Quebec, Canada
- Coordinates: 59.45°N 74.00°W
- Primary outflows: Arnaud River
- Basin countries: Canada
- Max. length: 103 km (64 mi)
- Max. width: 12 km (7.5 mi)
- Surface area: 513 km^{2} (198 sq mi)
- Surface elevation: 130 m (430 ft)

Payne Lake is a lake on the Ungava Peninsula of northern Quebec, and the main source of the Arnaud River. It lies at an elevation of 130 metres (430 ft) and is 103 kilometres (64 mi) long and 12 kilometres (7.5 mi) wide, covering an area of 513 square kilometres (198 sq mi). The lake is named after Frank F. Payne, an English-born meteorologist who explored and operated a weather station in the Hudson Strait area in the 1880s. The Inuit call the lake Tasirruaq (also previously transliterated as Tasurak), or the great lake.

The lake features excellent fishing for lake trout, and also contains brook trout and landlocked arctic char. Caribou are found in the region.

In 1948, the first European expedition to reach Payne Lake discovered ruins that they attributed to the Dorset culture. In 1965, Thomas E. Lee re-investigated the ruins and advanced the theory that they were of Norse pre-Columbian origin. Lee's interpretation of other sites on the Ungava coast as being Norse settlements has been rejected by other archaeologists, who have found that they are more plausibly associated with the Dorset. The evidence Lee presented from the Payne Lake excavations has been described by others as either being equally indicative of Norse or Inuit origin, or wholly inconsistent with known patterns of Norse settlement. However, the Payne Lake structures are also different from the Dorset longhouses on the Ungava coast and it is not possible to definitively ascribe a Dorset origin to them.
