= Nameless Lake (Manitoulin District) =

- Location of Nameless Lake in Ontario
- Location: Manitoulin, Ontario, Canada
- Coordinates: 45°49′59″N 82°26′17″W
- Type: Lake
- Primary outflows: Endorheic lake
- Max. length: 2 km (1.2 mi)
- Max. width: .5 km (0.31 mi)
- Average depth: 15 m (49 ft)
- Surface elevation: 225 m (738 ft)

Nameless Lake is a small, spring-fed endorheic lake on Manitoulin Island in Lake Huron approximately 8.5 kilometres (5.3 mi) south of the town of Gore Bay in the municipality of Gordon/Barrie Island, Manitoulin District in Northeastern Ontario, Canada. It is approximately 2 kilometres (1 mi) long and over 15 metres (49 ft) deep in some locations, with no public access. It is the only lake on Manitoulin Island that prohibits all gasoline-powered craft.

== See also ==
- List of lakes in Ontario
