= Lake Manitou =

Lake on Manitoulin Island, Ontario, Canada

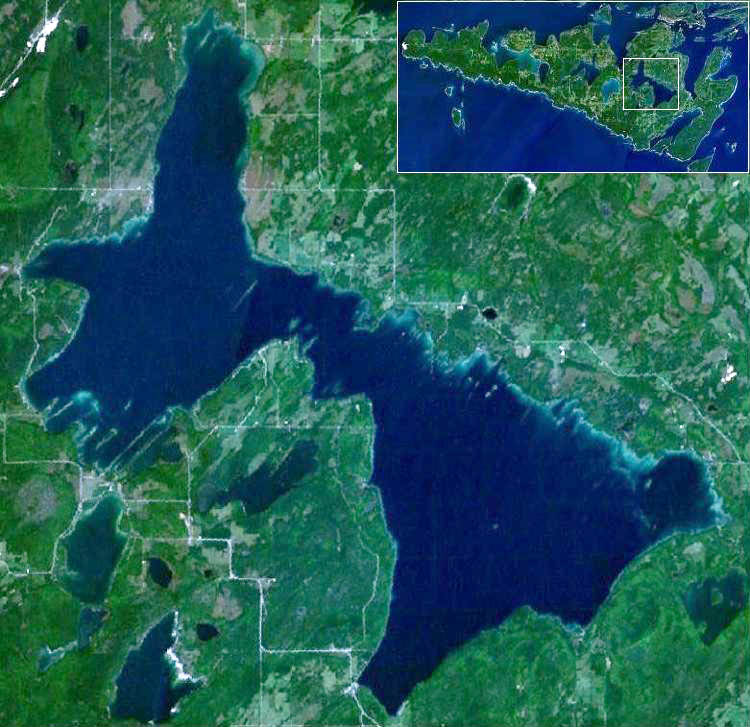
- Satellite image of Lake Manitou on Manitoulin Island

- Location within Ontario
- Location: Manitoulin Island, Lake Huron
- Coordinates: 45°46.7′N 81°59.5′W
- Primary outflows: Manitou River
- Basin countries: Canada
- Max. length: 19.8 kilometres (12.3 mi)
- Max. width: 6 kilometres (3.7 mi)
- Surface area: 104 km² (40 sq mi)
- Islands: 2

Lake Manitou is the largest lake on Manitoulin Island in Ontario, Canada. With an area of 104 square kilometres (40 sq mi), it is the largest lake on a lake island in the world. Reaching depths of up to 162 ft (49.4 m.), it is also the deepest of the 108 lakes on Manitoulin Island. Lake Manitou's depth creates a natural habitat for lake trout and ling, making it a popular fishing destination. Other fish including bass, whitefish, pickerel, and pike are also seen throughout the deep, clear waters. It is drained by the Manitou River.

There are several small islands in Lake Manitou, such as Roper Island and Bear Island in the very south of the western lobe of the lake, and McCracken's Island in the neck connecting the two lobes, making them islands in a lake on an island in a lake. However, none of the islands are as large as Treasure Island in a neighbouring, smaller lake on Manitoulin Island.

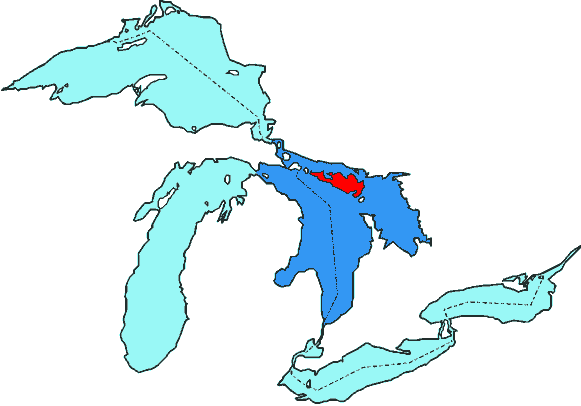
Manitoulin Island location in the Great Lakes

== See also ==
- List of lakes in Ontario
