= Ethel Rogers Mulvany =

Canadian social worker and teacher (1904–1992)

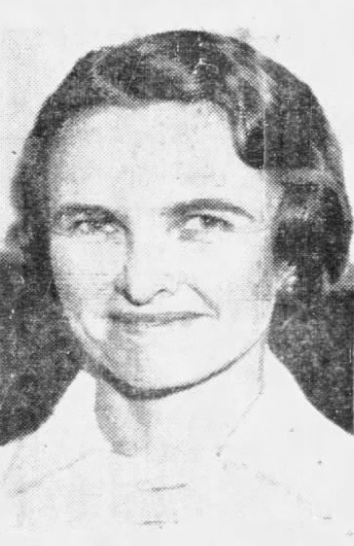
- Born: December 22, 1904
- Died: 1992 (aged 87–88)
- Occupations: Social worker, educator

Ethel Rogers Mulvany (December 22, 1904 – 1992) was a Canadian social worker and teacher. In the early 1930s, she travelled across Asia to complete an educational survey of different countries, and met her future husband during the trip. They married and moved to India. In 1935, Mulvany returned to Canada for the Canadian National Exhibition as director of an extensive Indian arts and culture exhibit, working on behalf of the government of the United Provinces of Agra and Oudh. She received a King's silver jubilee medal for her work at the Exhibition.

In 1940, she moved to Singapore with her husband. While confined to Changi Prison from 1942 to 1945 as a prisoner of war during the Second World War, Mulvany organized imaginary "feasts" with her fellow prisoners to stave off hunger and collected nearly 800 recipes, which she later compiled into a recipe book and sold to raise approximately $18,000 for former prisoners of war.

== Early life ==
Ethel Rogers was born on December 22, 1904 on Manitoulin Island, Ontario. After her birth mother died, she was adopted by Henry and Isabella Rogers. She had a brother named Harvey. As a teenager, she began working as a teacher, and moved to Toronto and Montreal for additional education. Rogers attended the University of Toronto, McGill University, and the London School of Economics.

== Work and marriage ==
In Toronto, Rogers became the director of a society for arts and literature, and in 1933 she set off on a tour of Asia in order to complete an educational survey for her society, sponsored by the Toronto Daily Star, the Geographical Magazine, and the Canadian government. She met a British army doctor named Denis Mulvany during her travels, and the couple were married in Lucknow, India, before settling in Cawnpore. While living there, Ethel Rogers Mulvany was bitten by a cobra, but survived with the help of a servant who provided first aid and brought her to a hospital by bicycle.

Mulvany returned to Canada for the 1935 Canadian National Exhibition, directing an arts and culture exhibit on behalf of the government of the United Provinces of Agra and Oudh. The exhibit included pieces made of ivory and alabaster, plates inlaid with semi-precious stones, sandalwood boxes and Indian rugs, and visitors spent thousands of dollars on purchases. As a gift from the administration of Agra and Oudh, Mulvany presented a tiger skin to Prime Minister R. B. Bennett. She organized a Jungle Club for children in Toronto that year, with membership fees going to support Indian women and children in need, and also arranged to ship several Indian animals—such as tiger cubs—to Canada for public viewing, although within three months most of the animals had died due to illness, heat or other causes. Mulvany received a King's silver jubilee medal for her work at the Exhibition.

Mulvany moved to Singapore with Denis in 1940, and she began volunteering with the Australian Red Cross.

== Imprisonment at Changchi ==
In late 1941 the Japanese invaded Singapore, and more than 2000 civilians—including Mulvany and her husband—were subsequently imprisoned in Changi Prison. The men and women were separated, and prisoners struggled with severe hunger on a daily basis. Inspired by a poet from Newfoundland who had written about imagined feasts during the Great Depression, Mulvany began bringing together her fellow prisoners to swap remembered recipes and imagine elaborate meals and dinner menus; the exercise helped them retain hope and provided respite from the grim conditions. Mulvany scavenged the blank edges of old newspapers to write down the recipes, and eventually managed to persuade prison staff to give her two logbooks to write in.

As another way to keep busy, Mulvany also helped organize a quilt-making project amongst the women, crafting blankets that would eventually be sent to nearby prisoner-of-war hospitals. The women included their signatures and images of personal significance in each quilt square as a way to communicate to loved ones that they were still alive.

For the last six months of her imprisonment, Mulvany was kept in solitary confinement. She suffered torture by electric shocks. Upon her release when the prison was liberated in August 1945, the five-foot-seven Mulvany weighed only 85 pounds.

== Return to Canada ==
After her liberation from the prison, Mulvany went to England with her husband. She received treatment at the Bethlem Royal Hospital. Her marriage with Denis broke down after their wartime ordeal, and she returned to Canada alone, eventually going to live with her aunt's family in Toronto. She persuaded a publisher to print a compilation of the women's recipes she had kept from Changi—almost 800 in total—and eventually raised $18,000 from sales of the resulting cookbook. Mulvany used the money to buy and ship food to other former prisoners of war, sending oranges and other goods to hospitals in England. In 1961, a Maclean's interview about Mulvany's survival in Changi Prison brought her cookbook to national attention.

Impacted by memories of prison conditions and poverty after her return to Canada, Mulvany soon decided she wanted a new way to support craftworkers and families in India and elsewhere. She developed the Treasure Van project in 1952 in partnership with McGill University students and the World University Service of Canada (WUSC), arranging for a van full of handicrafts to visit university campuses across the country. She served as manager for the project for seven years, before handing over responsibility to the WUSC and shifting to a role on the Van's committee. The WUSC continued its affiliation with the project until 1969.

In her sixties, Mulvany returned to school and completed a Bachelor of Arts degree at Laurentian University.

== Death and legacy ==
Mulvany died in 1992, after retiring to Manitoulin Island.

In 2013, the Manitoulin Historical Society republished her cookbook. Historian Suzanne Evans detailed Mulvany's story in The Taste of Longing: Ethel Mulvany and her Starving Prisoners of War Cookbook, which received an Ottawa Book Award for non-fiction in 2021 and the Ontario Historical Society's Donald Grant Creighton Award in 2022.

Several of the prisoners' quilts from Changchi can still be found in museums in Australia and the United Kingdom.
