= Mindemoya River =

River in Ontario, Canada

Coordinates: 45°40′02″N 82°16′08″W

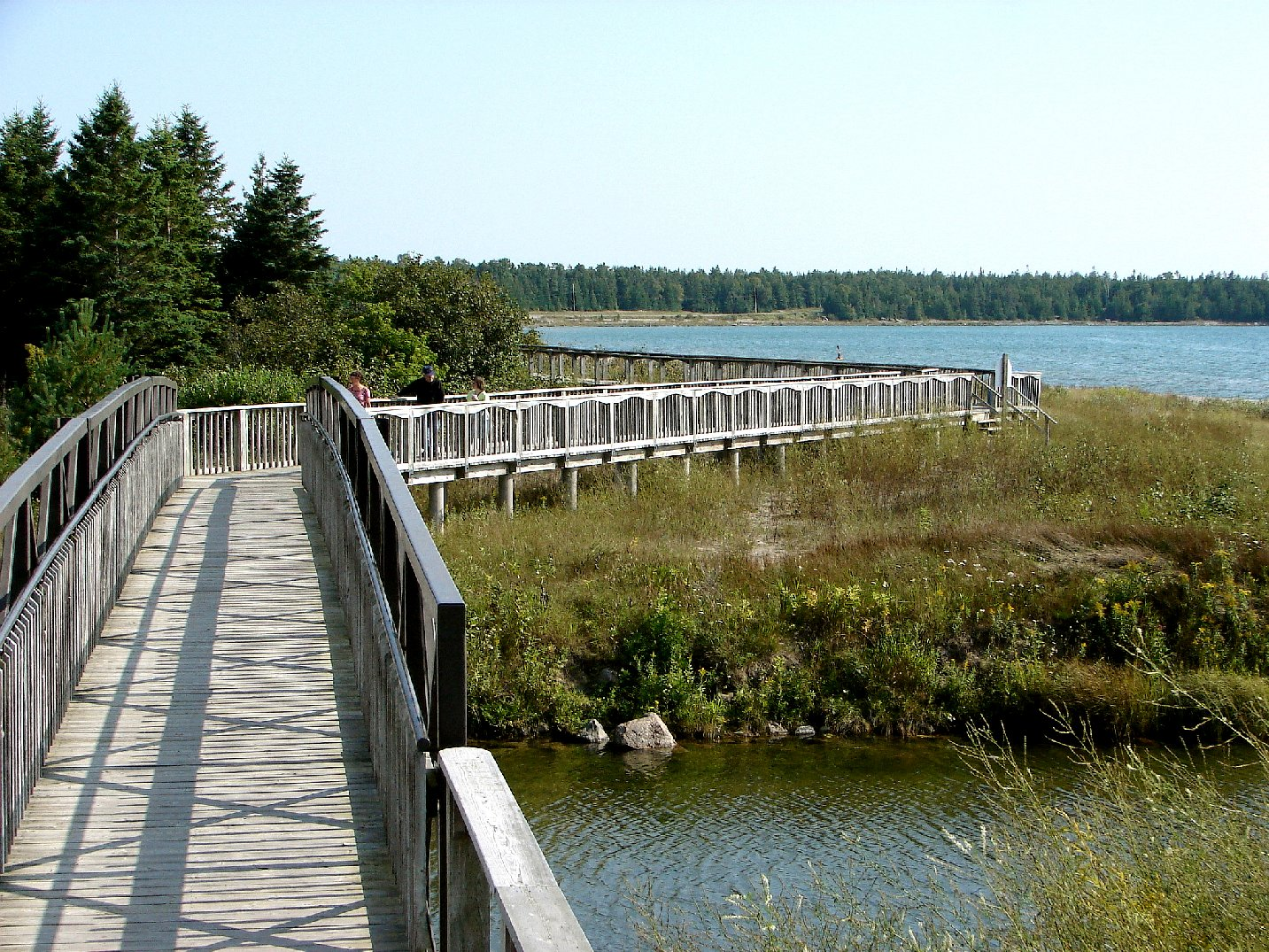
Boardwalk at the mouth of the Mindemoya River

The Mindemoya River is a river on Manitoulin Island in Ontario, Canada, which flows about 5 kilometres (3.1 mi) from Lake Mindemoya to empty into Providence Bay on Lake Huron. There is a boardwalk and large sandy beach at the mouth of the river. "Mindemoya" comes from the Ojibwe word mindimooyenh, which means "old woman". The river is accessible by both boat and foot at a number of points and is often fished for salmon and trout.

== See also ==
- List of Ontario rivers
