= Kangirsuk =

Kangirsuk ᑲᖏᕐᓱᖅ
- Northern village municipality
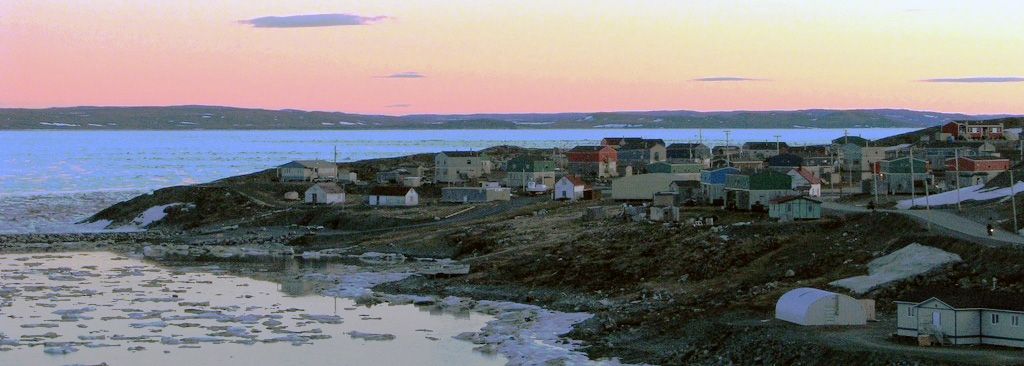

- Location within Quebec Location within Canada
- Coordinates (101, chemin Kuuvviliariaq): 60°01′N 70°02′W
- Country: Canada
- Province: Quebec
- Region: Nord-du-Québec
- TE: Kativik
- Established: 1921 (trading post)
- Constituted: January 17, 1981

Government
  - Mayor: Noah Eetook
  - Federal riding: Abitibi—Baie-James—Nunavik—Eeyou
  - Prov. riding: Ungava

Area
  - Total: 59.70 km^{2} (23.05 sq mi)
  - Land: 57.15 km^{2} (22.07 sq mi)

Population (2021)
  - Total: 561
  - Density: 9.8/km^{2} (25/sq mi)
  - Change (2016–21): ▼1.1%
  - Dwellings: 197
- Time zone: UTC−05:00 (EST)
  - Summer (DST): UTC−04:00 (EDT)
- Postal code(s): J0M 1A0
- Area code: 819
- Website: www.nvkangirsuk.ca

Kangirsuk (in Inuktitut: ᑲᖏᕐᓱᖅ/Kangirsuq, meaning "the bay") is an Inuit village in northern Nunavik, Quebec, Canada. It is 230 kilometres (140 mi) north of Kuujjuaq, between Aupaluk and Quaqtaq. The community is only accessible by air (Kangirsuk Airport) and, in late summer, by boat. The village used to be known also as Payne Bay and Bellin.

== Geography ==
Kangirsuk is located above the tree line near the mouth of the Arnaud River on the north shore of Payne Bay, 13 km (8.1 mi) inland from the western coast of Ungava Bay. A rocky cliff to the north and a large, rocky hill to the west partially surround the village.

=== Climate ===
Kangirsuk has a tundra climate (ET), characterized by long, cold winters and short, but cool and rainy summers with chilly nights.

Climate data for Kangirsuk
Month	Jan	Feb	Mar	Apr	May	Jun	Jul	Aug	Sep	Oct	Nov	Dec	Year
Mean daily maximum °C (°F)	−18.5 (−1.3)	−18.6 (−1.5)	−13.9 (7.0)	−6.1 (21.0)	1.5 (34.7)	7.3 (45.1)	12.1 (53.8)	11.5 (52.7)	7.2 (45.0)	1.2 (34.2)	−4.5 (23.9)	−12.7 (9.1)	−2.8 (27.0)
Mean daily minimum °C (°F)	−26.4 (−15.5)	−26.7 (−16.1)	−22.0 (−7.6)	−14.2 (6.4)	−4.8 (23.4)	0.2 (32.4)	3.4 (38.1)	3.6 (38.5)	0.8 (33.4)	−3.9 (25.0)	−10.8 (12.6)	−20.0 (−4.0)	−10.1 (13.9)
Average precipitation mm (inches)	21 (0.8)	19 (0.7)	19 (0.7)	17 (0.7)	22 (0.9)	39 (1.5)	47 (1.9)	57 (2.2)	43 (1.7)	37 (1.5)	34 (1.3)	25 (1.0)	380 (14.9)

== History ==
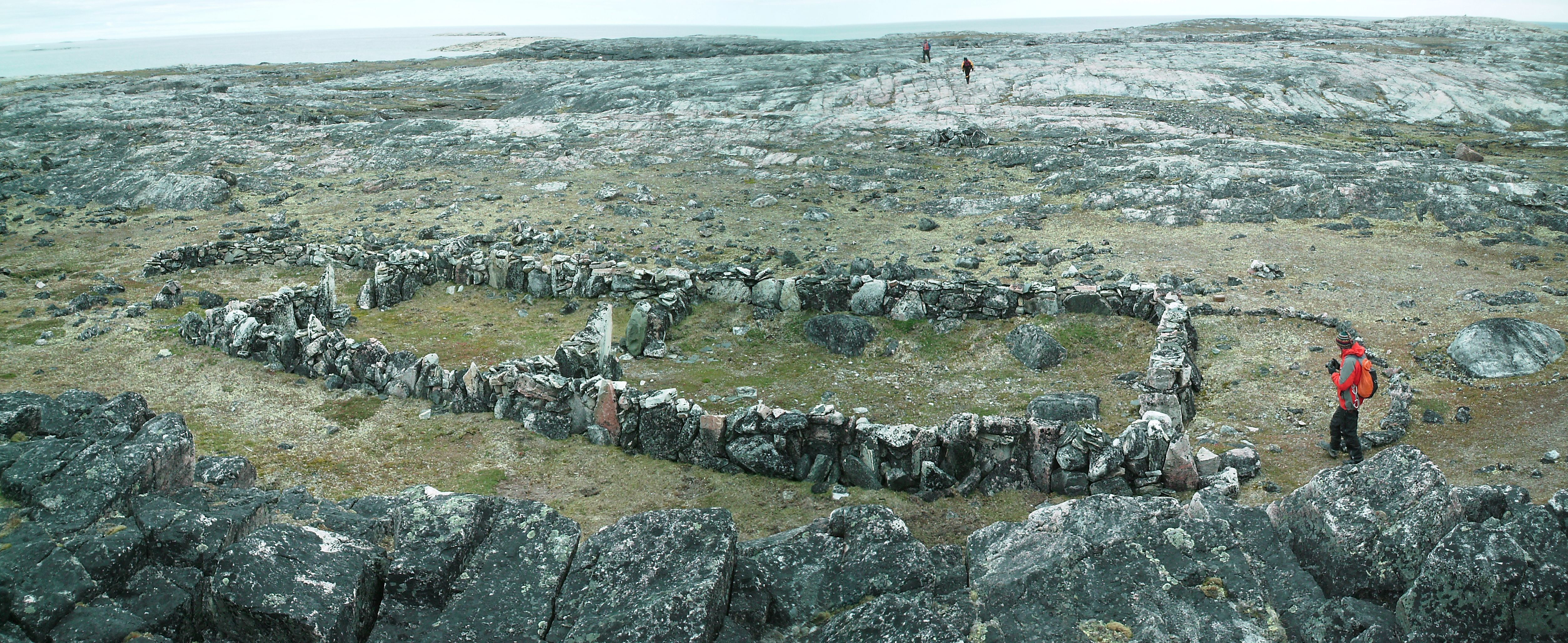
Pamiok Island, Longhouse No. 2

In the 11th century the area was possibly visited by Vikings. Not far from the village on Pamiok Island, Thomas E. Lee, an archaeologist from Université Laval, discovered a stone foundation of what he identified at the time to be a Viking long house. More recent archaeological investigations have identified the site as being part of the Dorset culture. Another archeological site, Hammer of Thor, is located on north shores of Payne River about 25 km (16 mi) west of the village.

Inuit have hunted and fished along the Ungava Bay coast for centuries. Permanent European settlement did not occur until 1921 when the Revillon Frères company set up a trading post here, named Payne River (now the Arnaud River) in memory of Frank F. Payne, who explored the region during the winter of 1885–1886. Four years later, the competing Hudson's Bay Company also set up a post. The Inuit remained nomadic however and only visited the site as a summer encampment because of the abundance of game.

In 1945, the location was known as Payne Bay. In 1959, the federal day school was founded. From then on permanent settlement by Inuit finally began. In 1961, the federal government provided healthcare facilities, housing, and social services. That same year, the Quebec Government decided to give French names to places of the northern Quebec coast and changed the name of the post to Francis-Babel, in honour of Louis-François Babel (1826-1912). But this name did not take root, and was replaced a year later with Bellin, named after Jacques-Nicolas Bellin (1703-1772). It was subsequently known as Bellin (Payne) until 1980. That year, the name was changed to Kangiqsuk when the village was incorporated as a Northern Village Municipality (French: municipalité de village nordique). Local authorities disagreed with this transliteration, and in 1982 it was corrected to Kangirsuk.

Since 1996, the police services in Kangirsuk are provided by the Kativik Regional Police Force.

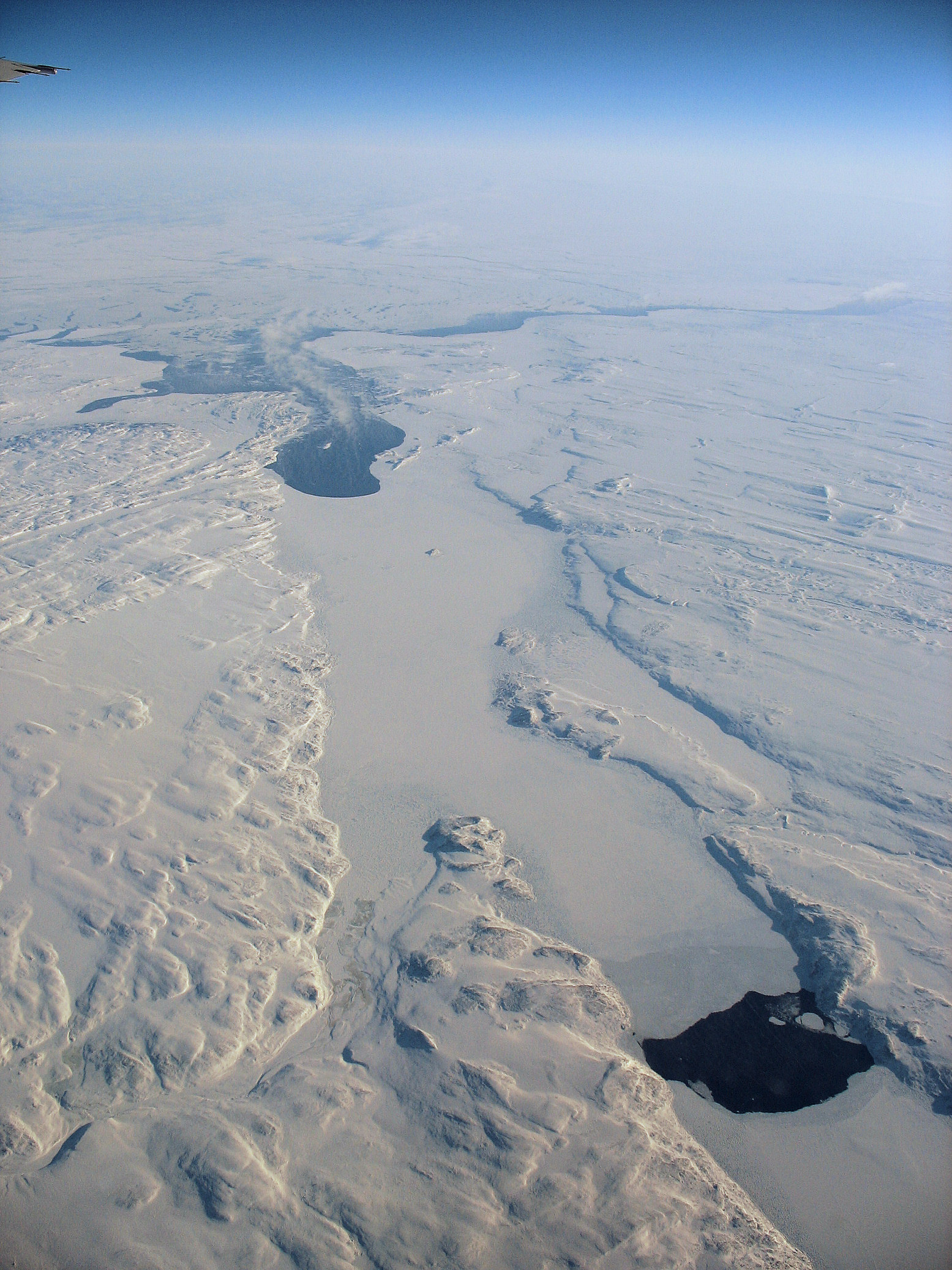
The barren terrain at the mouth of the Arnaud River and Payne Bay. Kangirsuk is faintly visible on the north (left) shore just below the open water.

The community is depicted in the 2019 short film Throat Singing in Kangirsuk (Katatjatuuk Kangirsumi).

== Demographics ==
In the 2021 Census of Population conducted by Statistics Canada, Kangirsuk had a population of 561 living in 170 of its 197 total private dwellings, a change of −1.1% from its 2016 population of 567. With a land area of 57.15 km^{2} (22.07 sq mi), it had a population density of 9.8/km^{2} (25.4/sq mi) in 2021.

Population trend:

- Population in 2021: 561 (2016 to 2021 population change: -1.1%)
- Population in 2016: 567
- Population in 2011: 549
- Population in 2006: 466
- Population in 2001: 436
- Population in 1996: 394
- Population in 1991: 351

== Education ==
The Kativik School Board operates the Sautjuit School.

== Flora and fauna ==
Payne Bay and the Arnaud River are renowned for its excellent mussel harvesting. Numerous nearby lakes and rivers provide an abundance of Arctic char and lake trout.

On the islands of Kyak Bay and Virgin Lake located to the east and north-east of Kangirsuk, respectively, important colonies of eider ducks nest every year.
