= Arnaud River =

Canadian river

Arnaud River Rivière Arnaud
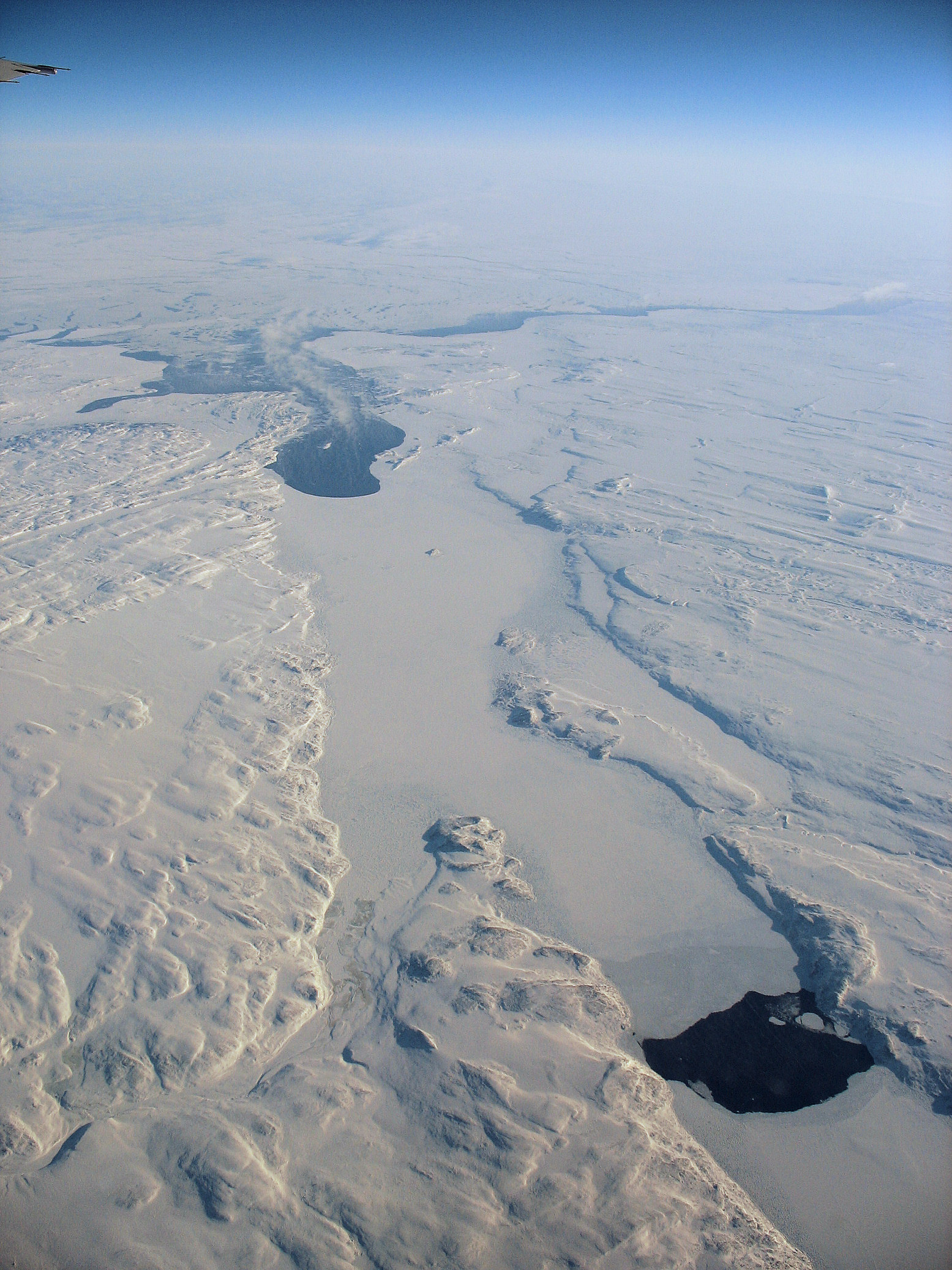
- Payne Bay and mouth of the Arnaud River. Kangirsuk is faintly visible on the north (left) shore.

- Location of mouth in Quebec

Location
- Country: Canada
- Province: Quebec
- Region: Nunavik

Physical characteristics
- Source: Payne Lake
- Mouth: Ungava Bay
  - coordinates: 59°58′55″N 69°45′31″W
- Length: 377 km (234 mi)
- Basin size: 49,500 km^{2} (19,100 sq mi)
- Discharge
  - average: 670 m^{3}/s (24,000 cu ft/s)

The Arnaud River (formerly known as the Payne River) is a river in Nunavik, Quebec, Canada, flowing from the low plateaux of the Ungava Peninsula through a series of glacial lakes to Ungava Bay. Its mean discharge is approximately 15 cubic kilometres (3.6 cu mi) per year, but the river flows only in the summer as it is frozen to several metres for the rest of the year. The total length of the river is about 377 kilometres (234 mi), but there are several main channels in the upper reaches of the river, most of them unnamed and hardly sighted even by the native Inuit.

The Inuit village of Kangirsuk lies near the mouth of the Arnaud River on the north shore of Payne Bay, 13 kilometres (8.1 mi) inland from the western coast of Ungava Bay. About 22 kilometres (14 mi) upstream from Kangirsuk is the Hammer of Thor archaeological site.

Most of the basin is almost totally barren owing to the harsh climate - the mean temperature is only about 7 °C (45 °F) even at the height of summer and continuous permafrost extends deep from only half a metre below the surface. The only vegetation is low shrubs at the lower levels, for no trees grow within the Arnaud basin even in the most sheltered sites, and the river freezes for too long to make hydroelectric development feasible.

== Gallery ==
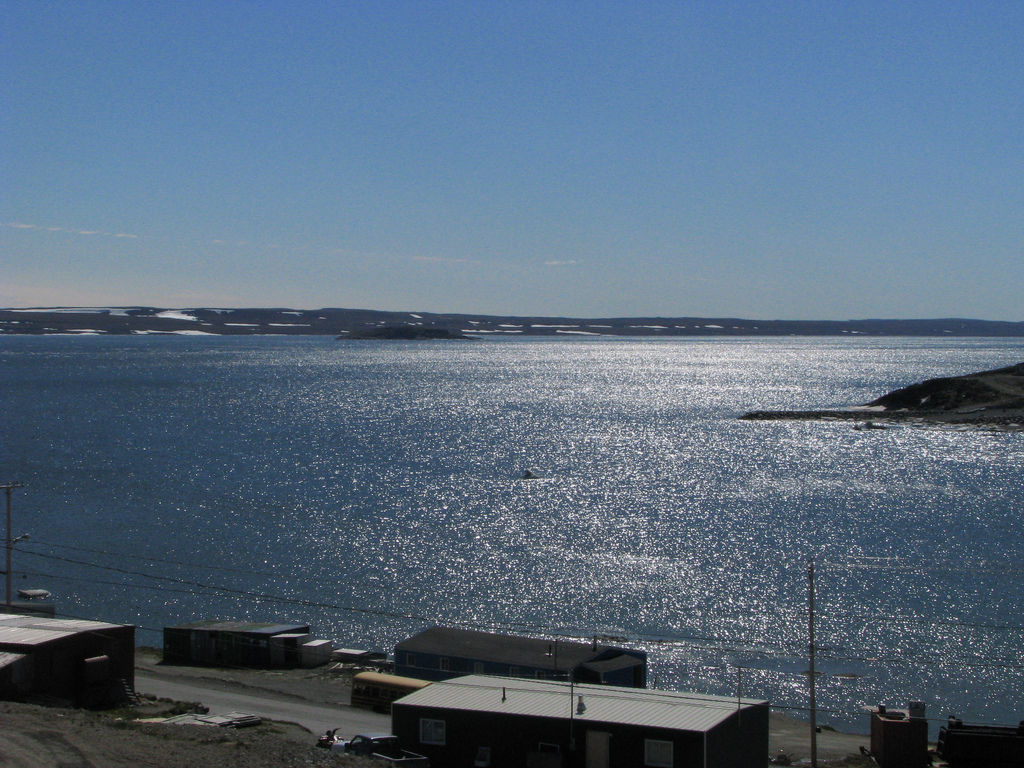
Payne River at Kangirsuk

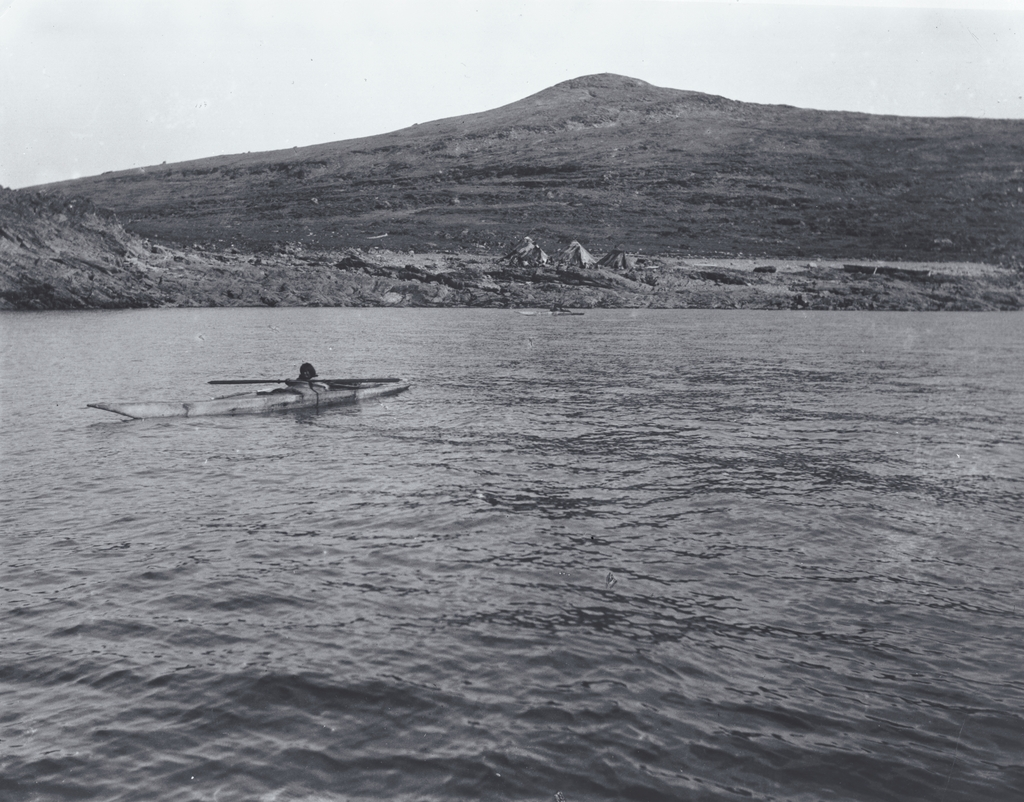
Inuit Encampment, Payne River (Arnaud) (2241)
