= Thomas E. Lee =

Canadian archaeologist (1914–1982)

Thomas Edward Lee (1914–1982) was an archaeologist for the National Museum of Canada in the 1950s. He was the discoverer of Sheguiandah on Manitoulin Island. Public interest in the find contributed to passage in Ontario of a bill to protect archeological sites. While working with Laval University's Centre for Northern Studies, Lee discovered the Cartier Site on the Ungava Peninsula in Quebec.

== Early life and education ==
Thomas Edward Lee was born April 6, 1914, at Port Bruce, Elgin County in southwestern Ontario, Canada. At the University of Michigan and University of Toronto, he studied archaeology.

== Career ==
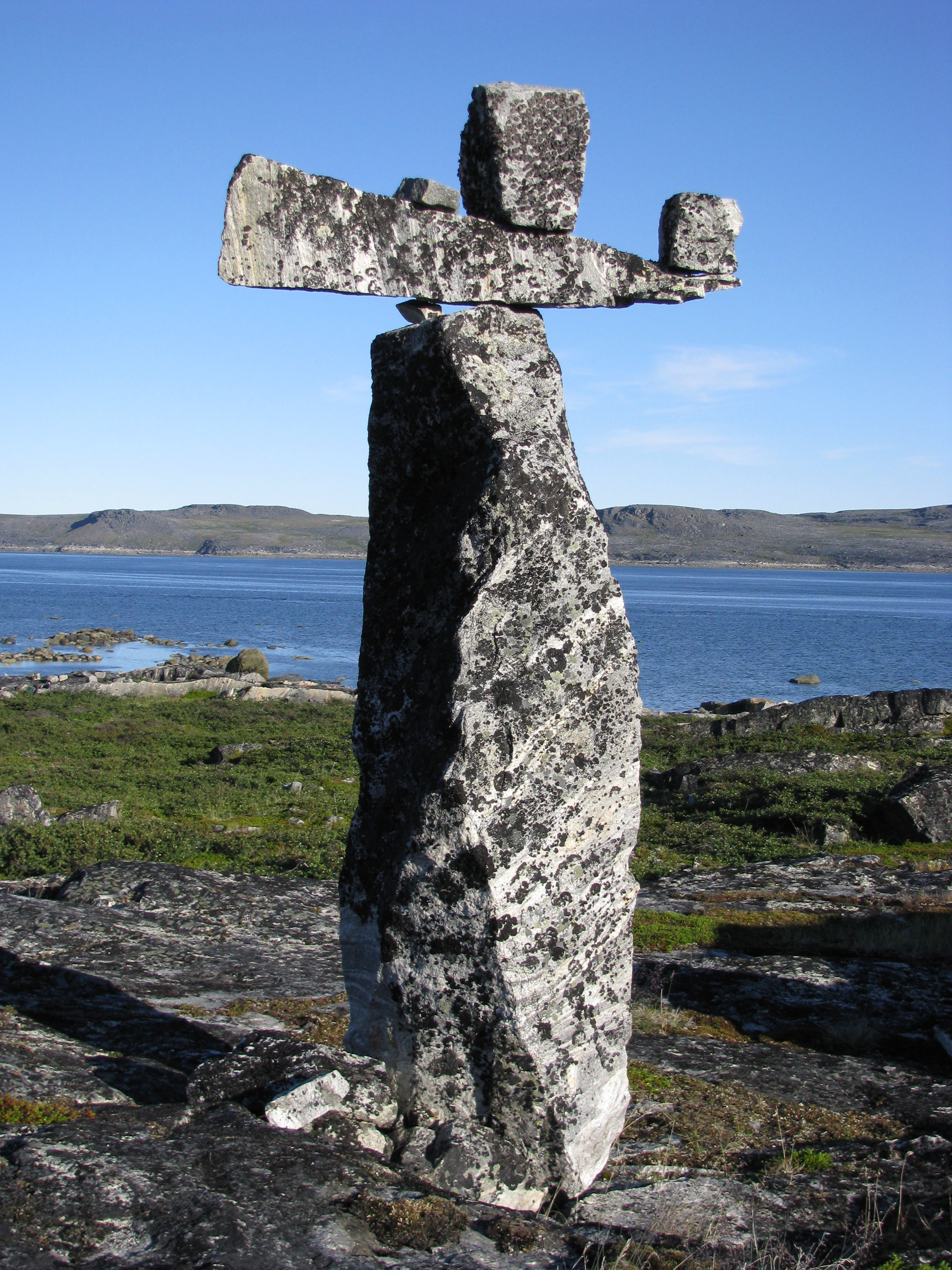
The Hammer of Thor

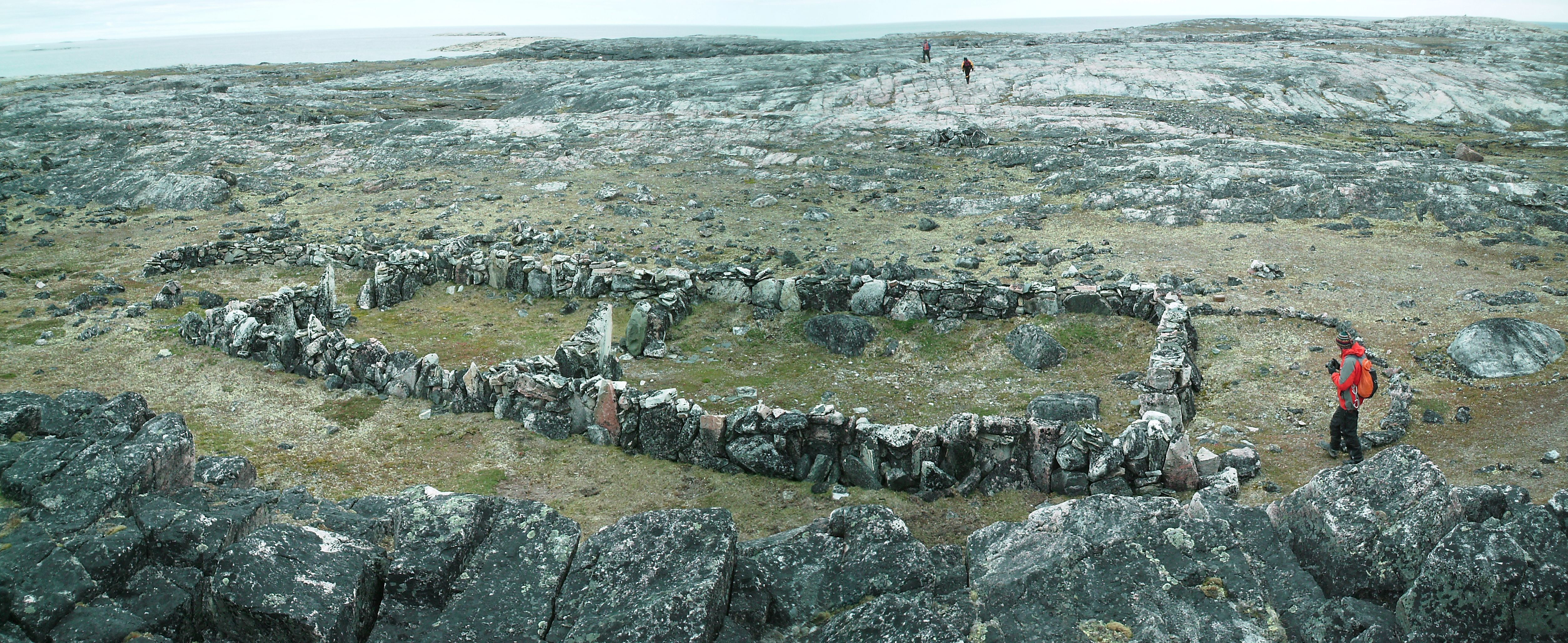
Pamiok Island, Longhouse No. 2

Lee started working at the National Museum of Canada soon after completing graduate school. His discoveries while with them include Sheguiandah on Manitoulin Island in 1952. Public interest was raised by the finds, which included a wealth of artifacts. Lee believed he found evidence of four successive cultures. The important find contributed to passage in 1953 of legislation to protect archeological sites in Ontario. Lee returned to the site three more times with teams to undertake thorough evaluation of the artifacts and the geology.

Sheguiandah has also been excavated by other teams, including Storck and Patrick Julig, who disagreed with some of Lee's conclusions. All agree the site has evidence of Paleo-Indian and Archaic cultures, dating to about 10,000 BCE.

In 1960, he was commissioned to study the former 1660 Des Ormeaux battle site in Long Sault, Ontario.

When Lee's mentor, Jacques Rousseau, was ousted from the National Museum, Lee resigned out of loyalty. He did not gain full-time archaeological work until he took a position with Laval University. He taught there for the rest of his career.

In 1964, Lee investigated the Cartier Site at Payne Lake on Quebec's Ungava Peninsula. He thought it could be the earliest European settlement in North America. (This conclusion was extrapolated from results of carbon dating.) He found a stone landmark which Inuit tradition said had preceded their arrival in the area. Thinking it to be an artifact of Viking exploration, Lee named it "Hammer of Thor". Some scholars believe it may be an ancient Inuit inukshuk, a type of stone landmark.

In 1970, Lee excavated & researched longhouses on Pamiok Island, Ungava Bay, near Kangirsuk.

The Cartier Site revealed stone foundations, similar to other discoveries in the Canadian Arctic. Lee thought these to be "temporary shelters built by Norse voyagers visiting the region around A.D. 1000". This would make these sites the same age as L'Anse aux Meadows.

Lee revisited the site of his 1952 discovery at Manitoulin Island, Ontario. While being a resident in Ottawa, Ontario, he died on August 2, 1982.

== See also ==
- Hammer of Thor (monument) - thought by Lee to be a monument erected by the Vikings, on the Ungava Peninsula in northern Quebec
