= Michael's Bay =

- Ghost town
- Location within Southern Ontario
- Coordinates: 45°36′08″N 82°06′06″W
- Country: Canada
- Province: Ontario
- District: Manitoulin
- Municipality: Tehkummah
- Time zone: UTC-5 (EST)
  - Summer (DST): UTC-4 (EDT)

Michael's Bay is a ghost town in Tehkummah, Ontario, Canada. It was located on the namesake bay at the mouth of the Manitou River.

Certain areas of Manitoulin Island were covered under the Treaty of 1862 and Indigenous peoples relocated after it was signed. Michael's Bay was the first area to be used by settlers, eventually becoming the largest settlement on the island. The town was known for its prominent lumber industry from the 1860s to the early 1900s. At its height, Michael's Bay had a post office, two boarding houses, a lighthouse, a lath mill, a sawmill, and a shingle mill. A school was established in 1874. While the industry was quite lucrative at first, financial prospects dwindled once Americans began charging tariffs on Canadian exports. By 1890, most of the town's residents had moved. A 1914 fire ruined the bulk of the remaining infrastructure.

The original lighthouse stopped functioning in 1947. Members of the Michael's Bay Historical Society successfully campaigned for a replacement that was built in 2006. The new lighthouse is solar-powered and has a historical plaque at its base. In 2005, a property in Michael's Bay was subject to a criminal investigation by Belgium, which alleged that a Canadian couple had been using it to sell bovine growth hormone, and successfully encouraged the Canadian government to seize the land. Some of the land remained unsold until 2021, when it was bought by the Michael's Bay Historical Society.

== See also ==
- List of ghost towns in Ontario
