= Treasure Island (Ontario) =

Large island in Lake Mindemoya, Ontario

Coordinates: 45.7643°N 82.1774°W

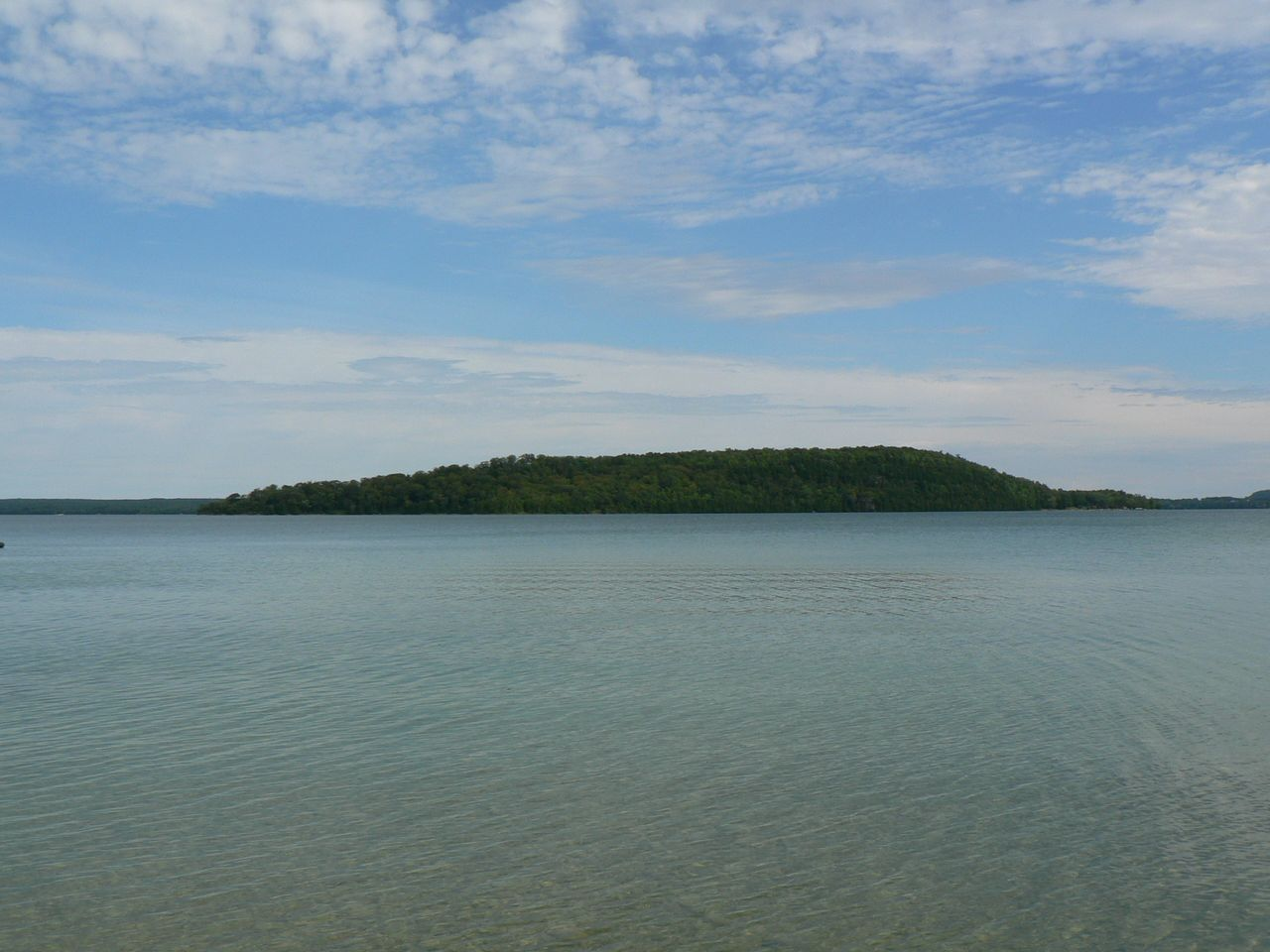
Treasure Island from the south

Treasure Island, also known as Mindemoya, is a small island in Lake Mindemoya, on Manitoulin Island, which is in Lake Huron. Aside from being Manitoulin's largest island at approximately 0.445 km^{2} (0.2 sq mi) in area, it is notable for being the world's largest natural island in a lake on an island in a lake.

The island has no permanent residents, but there are some cottages. Treasure Island lies at an elevation of 200 metres (660 ft) above sea level, with its highest point being about 225 metres (738 ft) above sea level. It is about 1.4 km (1 mile) in length and about 400 meters (yards) wide and about 110 acres.

== History ==
In 1883, the island was purchased for $60 (equivalent to $1,899 in 2025) by William McPherson, a Toronto deputy chief of police. Forty-five years later, in 1928, the island was sold to Joe and Jean Hodgson. The Hodgsons established a tourist camp on the island. Treasure Island Resort remained in business until Joe Hodgson died in 1968. Jean tried to run it but was unsuccessful. The resort was sold a couple of times and became run down. Finally, the Moeller family of Spencerville, Ohio, bought Treasure Island in 1980. It then became a corporate and family retreat.

== The legend of Mindemoya ==
According to local tradition, Treasure Island was originally named Mindemoya, because of the distinctive shape of the island: rising at one end to a long, flat hill, with a steep drop to a short, low area at the other end. There are many legends about the origin of the island. One of them tells of a great chieftain or demi-god who once lived in Sault Ste. Marie, Ontario, had a wife who would not give him any peace. In frustration he eventually kicked her and sent her flying, to land on her hands and knees in Lake Mindemoya, leaving her back and rump above the water, which we see today as the island. The word "Mindemoya" supposedly means "old lady's bottom". The island lent its name to Lake Mindemoya and in turn to the village of Mindemoya, Ontario. The island was renamed "Treasure Island" by a tourist operator who built a resort there in the early 20th century.

== See also ==
- Lake island
- List of islands of Canada
- Recursive islands and lakes
