= Lake Mindemoya =

Lake in Ontario, Canada

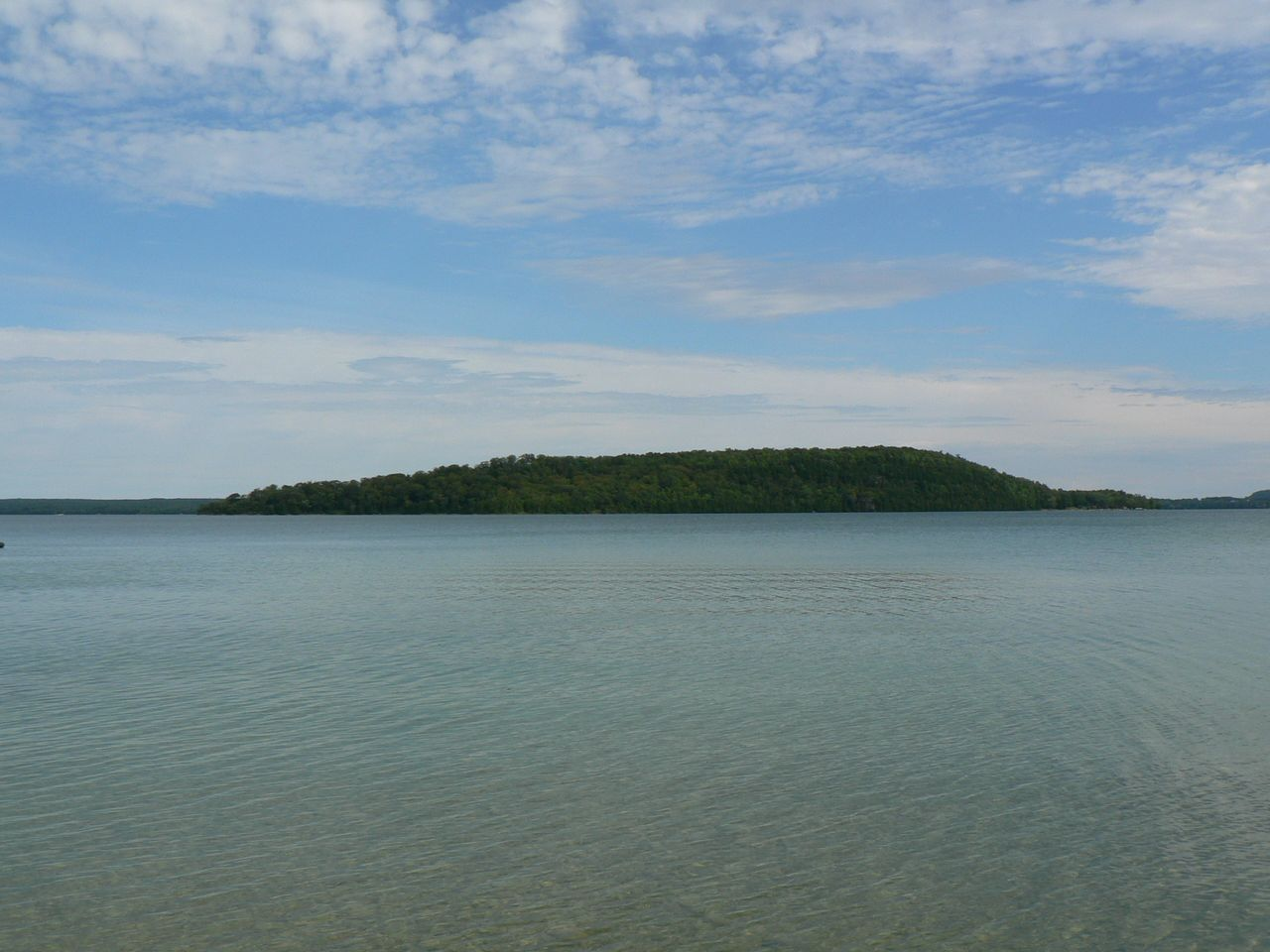
- Lake Mindemoya, with its Treasure Island in distance

- Location within Canada Location within Ontario
- Location: Manitoulin Island, Ontario
- Coordinates: 45.762°N 82.209°W
- Basin countries: Canada
- Max. length: 10.9 km (6.8 mi)
- Max. width: 6.4 km (4.0 mi)
- Surface area: 3,869 ha (9,560 acres)
- Average depth: 7.3 m (24 ft)
- Max. depth: 21 m (69 ft)
- Islands: Treasure Island

Lake Mindemoya is a lake in Ontario, Canada, located within Manitoulin Island which is the world's largest island in a freshwater lake (Lake Huron). The lake is located near the town of Mindemoya, and it is the third largest on Manitoulin Island. It has a perimeter of 33.5 km (20.8 miles), its marl clay base imparting to a deep blue to light green colour. The lake reaches depths of 21 m (69'), while the average depth is 7.3 m (24'); the surface area is 3,869 ha (9,562 acres).

Mindemoya is a moderately fertile lake that favours a warm water fishery; brook and rainbow trout can be caught in the Mindemoya River, which exits the lake on the south side and flows into Providence Bay. A concrete public boat launch is located along Ketchankookem Trail on the east side of the lake. The major fish species include smallmouth bass, walleye, yellow perch, whitefish and northern pike.

Mindemoya Lake is located within Fisheries Management Zone 10.

Mindemoya Lake contains Treasure Island, which is the largest island in the world in a lake on an island in a lake.

== See also ==
- List of lakes in Ontario
