= Tehkummah =

- Township (single-tier)
- Township of Tehkummah
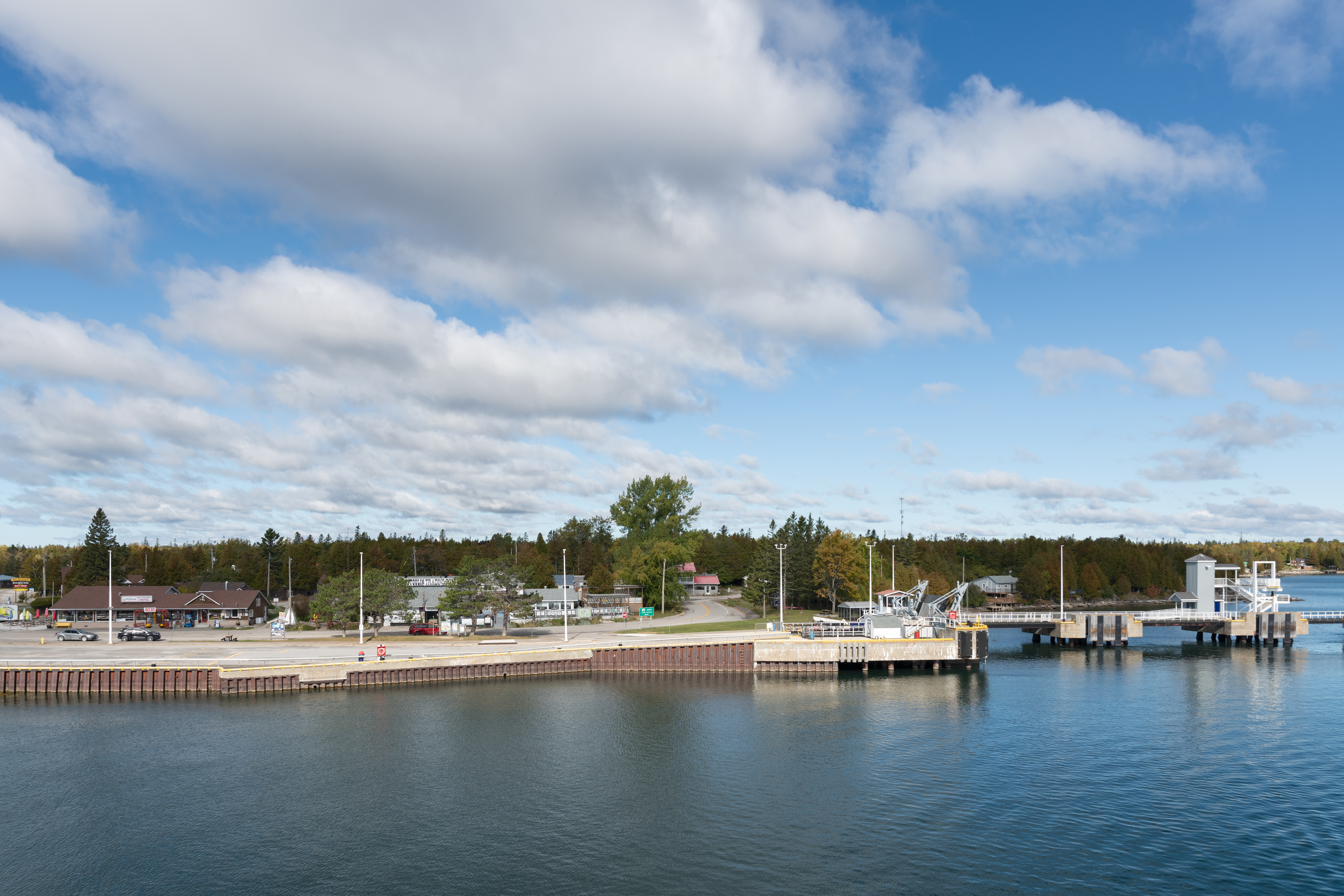
- South Baymouth

- Location within Manitoulin District Location within Ontario
- Coordinates: 45°39′N 81°59′W
- Country: Canada
- Province: Ontario
- District: Manitoulin
- Incorporated: 1881

Government
  - Type: Township
  - Reeve: John Carter Deforge
  - MP: Jim Belanger (Conservative)
  - MPP: Bill Rosenberg (PC)

Area
  - Land: 131.70 km^{2} (50.85 sq mi)

Population (2021)
  - Total: 450
  - Density: 3.4/km^{2} (8.8/sq mi)
- Time zone: UTC-5 (EST)
  - Summer (DST): UTC-4 (EDT)
- Postal code: P0P 2C0
- Area codes: 705, 249
- Website: tehkummah.ca

Tehkummah is a township in the Canadian province of Ontario, located on Manitoulin Island.

== Communities ==
The best known community in the township is South Baymouth (45°33′41″N 82°0′36″W), the northern docking point of the MS Chi-Cheemaun passenger-car ferry which traverses the Main Channel of Georgian Bay to the community of Tobermory on the Bruce Peninsula. At the dock, the provincial Highway 6, whose southern segment ends at Tobermory, resumes and continues northward to its terminus at Highway 17 north of Espanola.

The administrative centre of the township is the community of Tehkummah (45°39′18″N 82°0′56″W).

The township also includes the ghost towns of Michael's Bay and Snowville.

== Demographics ==
In the 2021 Census of Population conducted by Statistics Canada, Tehkummah had a population of 450 living in 224 of its 368 total private dwellings, a change of 3.2% from its 2016 population of 436. With a land area of 131.7 km^{2} (50.8 sq mi), it had a population density of 3.4/km^{2} (8.8/sq mi) in 2021.

Canada census – Tehkummah community profile

	2021	2016	2011
Population	450 (+3.2% from 2016)	436 (+7.4% from 2011)	406 (+6.3% from 2006)
Land area	131.70 km^{2} (50.85 sq mi)	132.48 km^{2} (51.15 sq mi)	132.48 km^{2} (51.15 sq mi)
Population density	3.4/km^{2} (8.8/sq mi)	3.3/km^{2} (8.5/sq mi)	3.1/km^{2} (8.0/sq mi)
Median age	59.6 (M: 60.0, F: 59.6)	59.0 (M: 58.9, F: 59.2)
Private dwellings	368 (total) 224 (occupied)	333 (total)	353 (total)
Median household income	$60,800	$50,432

References: 2021 2016 2011

Historical census populations – Tehkummah

Year	Pop.	±%
1881	506	—
1891	405	−20.0%
1901	521	+28.6%
1911	577	+10.7%
1921	560	−2.9%
1931	537	−4.1%
1941	556	+3.5%
1951	509	−8.5%

Year	Pop.	±%
1956	521	+2.4%
1961	473	−9.2%
1966	456	−3.6%
1971	453	−0.7%
1976	385	−15.0%
1981	370	−3.9%
1986	349	−5.7%
1991	389	+11.5%

Year	Pop.	±%
1996	371	−4.6%
2001	367	−1.1%
2006	382	+4.1%
2011	406	+6.3%
2016	436	+7.4%
2021	450	+3.2%

Population counts are not adjusted for boundary changes.
Source: Statistics Canada

== Climate ==
Climate data for South Baymouth (1981−2010)
Month	Jan	Feb	Mar	Apr	May	Jun	Jul	Aug	Sep	Oct	Nov	Dec	Year
Record high °C (°F)	7.8 (46.0)	8.0 (46.4)	15.0 (59.0)	24.5 (76.1)	29.5 (85.1)	30.0 (86.0)	33.9 (93.0)	32.5 (90.5)	28.3 (82.9)	23.9 (75.0)	17.2 (63.0)	14.0 (57.2)	33.9 (93.0)
Mean daily maximum °C (°F)	−3.2 (26.2)	−2.4 (27.7)	1.5 (34.7)	8.2 (46.8)	14.6 (58.3)	19.3 (66.7)	23.3 (73.9)	22.5 (72.5)	17.4 (63.3)	11.3 (52.3)	5.3 (41.5)	−0.4 (31.3)	9.8 (49.6)
Daily mean °C (°F)	−7.9 (17.8)	−7.2 (19.0)	−3.3 (26.1)	3.8 (38.8)	9.7 (49.5)	14.2 (57.6)	18.2 (64.8)	17.9 (64.2)	13.5 (56.3)	7.7 (45.9)	2.1 (35.8)	−4.2 (24.4)	5.4 (41.7)
Mean daily minimum °C (°F)	−12.5 (9.5)	−12 (10)	−8 (18)	−0.7 (30.7)	4.8 (40.6)	9.0 (48.2)	13.1 (55.6)	13.3 (55.9)	9.5 (49.1)	4.0 (39.2)	−1 (30)	−7.9 (17.8)	1.0 (33.8)
Record low °C (°F)	−37 (−35)	−36.5 (−33.7)	−31.1 (−24.0)	−19.5 (−3.1)	−4.4 (24.1)	0.0 (32.0)	4.4 (39.9)	−0.6 (30.9)	−3.5 (25.7)	−8.3 (17.1)	−19 (−2)	−33 (−27)	−37 (−35)
Average precipitation mm (inches)	78.1 (3.07)	49.8 (1.96)	63.9 (2.52)	69.2 (2.72)	71.6 (2.82)	58.6 (2.31)	50.9 (2.00)	74.2 (2.92)	95.2 (3.75)	112.0 (4.41)	92.2 (3.63)	94.0 (3.70)	909.6 (35.81)
Average rainfall mm (inches)	13.1 (0.52)	6.5 (0.26)	38.0 (1.50)	57.9 (2.28)	71.6 (2.82)	58.6 (2.31)	50.9 (2.00)	74.2 (2.92)	95.2 (3.75)	111.9 (4.41)	73.6 (2.90)	29.6 (1.17)	681.1 (26.81)
Average snowfall cm (inches)	65.0 (25.6)	43.3 (17.0)	25.9 (10.2)	11.3 (4.4)	0.0 (0.0)	0.0 (0.0)	0.0 (0.0)	0.0 (0.0)	0.0 (0.0)	0.08 (0.03)	18.5 (7.3)	64.5 (25.4)	228.4 (89.9)
Average precipitation days (≥ 0.2 mm)	15.9	11.2	10.5	12.1	11.2	10.2	7.9	10.6	12.9	14.9	14.1	17.4	148.9
Average rainy days (≥ 0.2 mm)	2.7	1.9	5.6	10.2	11.2	10.2	7.9	10.6	12.9	14.9	10.6	5.9	104.5
Average snowy days (≥ 0.2 cm)	13.5	9.7	5.6	2.5	0.0	0.0	0.0	0.0	0.0	0.08	3.8	12.8	48.1
Mean monthly sunshine hours	74.3	97.5	162.8	190.8	242.9	264.6	307.1	256.2	187.8	127.9	70.4	57.5	2,039.8
Percentage possible sunshine	26.2	33.4	44.2	47.1	52.6	56.4	64.7	58.6	49.8	37.6	24.6	21.1	43.0
Source: Environment Canada

== See also ==
- List of townships in Ontario
