= 2010 Manitoulin District municipal elections =

Elections were held in the organized municipalities in the Manitoulin District of Ontario on October 25, 2010 in conjunction with municipal elections across the province.

== Assiginack ==
Clyde "Bud" Rohn was elected reeve of Assiginack. Robert Case, Brad Ham, Paul Moffatt and Brenda Reid were elected to council.

Reeve Candidate	Vote	%
Bud Rohn	430	
Hugh Moggy	405	

== Billings ==
Incumbent reeve Austin Hunt was re-elected in Billings. Kim Bilbija, Sandi Hurcomb, Brian Parker and Tom Imrie were elected to council.

Mayoral Candidate	Vote	%
Austin Hunt (X)	316	
Magaret Tuomi	173	

== Burpee and Mills ==
Incumbent reeve Ken Noland was acclaimed back into office in Burpee and Mills.

Reeve Candidate	Vote	%
Ken Noland (X)	Acclaimed	

== Central Manitoulin ==
Gerry Strong defeated incumbent reeve Richard Stephens in Central Manitoulin. Adam Smith, Adam McDonald, Gloria Haner, Patricia MacDonald, Derek Stephens and Beverly Pearson-Trainor were elected to council.

Reeve Candidate	Vote	%
Gerry Strong	822	
Richard Stephens (X)	708	

== Cockburn Island ==
Incumbent reeve David Haight was acclaimed back into office in Cockburn Island.

Reeve Candidate	Vote	%
David Haight (X)	Acclaimed	

== Gordon/Barrie Island ==
No council elections were held in Gordon/Barrie Island, as the entire council won by acclamation. Jack Brady succeeded retiring reeve Art Madore, while council will consist of Betty Noble, Lee Hayden, Barbara Barfoot and Bob Glasgow.

Reeve Candidate	Vote	%
Jack Brady	Acclaimed	

== Gore Bay ==
Ron Lane defeated incumbent mayor Joyce Foster in Gore Bay. Wes Bentley, Yvonne Bailey, Lou Addison, Betsy Clark, Harry Vanderweerden and Jack Clark were elected to council.

Mayoral Candidate	Vote	%
Ron Lane	272	
Joyce Foster (incumbent)	131	
Dylon White	76	

== Northeastern Manitoulin and the Islands ==
Joe Chapman, a former mayor of Northeastern Manitoulin and the Islands who was defeated by Jim Stringer in 2006, defeated Stringer to reclaim the mayor's chair. Christina Jones, Bill Koehler, Al MacNevin, Marcel Gauthier, Dawn Orr, Paul Skippen and Bruce Wood were elected or acclaimed to council.

Mayoral Candidate	Vote	%
Joe Chapman	919	
Jim Stringer (incumbent)	831	

== Tehkummah ==
Incumbent reeve Gary Brown was acclaimed back into office in Tehkummah. Eric Russell, Lorie Leeson, Paul Bowerman and Arend Van Vierzen were elected to council.

Reeve Candidate	Vote	%
Gary Brown (X)	Acclaimed	
