= U of T (disambiguation) =

The University of Toronto (U of T) is a public research university in Greater Toronto, Ontario, Canada.

U of T may also refer to:

== United States ==
- University of Tampa, Florida
- University of Tennessee
- University of Texas at Austin, Texas
- University of Toledo, Ohio
- University of Tulsa, Oklahoma
- University of Turabo, Puerto Rico

== Global ==
- University of Tirana, Albania
- University of Tartu, Estonia
- University of Tehran, Iran
- University of Tokyo, Japan
- University of Twente, Netherlands

== See also ==
- University of Toronto (disambiguation)
- UT (disambiguation)
