= List of highways numbered 540 =

Route 540, or Highway 540, may refer to:

== Canada ==
- Alberta Highway 540
- New Brunswick Route 540
- Ontario Highway 540
  - Ontario Highway 540A
  - Ontario Highway 540B
- Quebec Autoroute 540

== United Kingdom ==
- A540 road

== United States ==
- Interstate 540 (disambiguation)
- Arkansas Highway 540 (former)
- Florida State Road 540
- County Road 540 (Polk County, Florida)
- Georgia State Route 540
- Hawaii Route 540
- Maryland Route 540
- County Route 540 (New Jersey)
- North Carolina Highway 540
- Ohio State Route 540
- Oregon Route 540
- Virginia State Route 540 (1931)
- Puerto Rico Highway 540
- Washington State Route 540

Preceded by 539	Lists of highways 540	Succeeded by 541
