= List of township municipalities in Ontario =

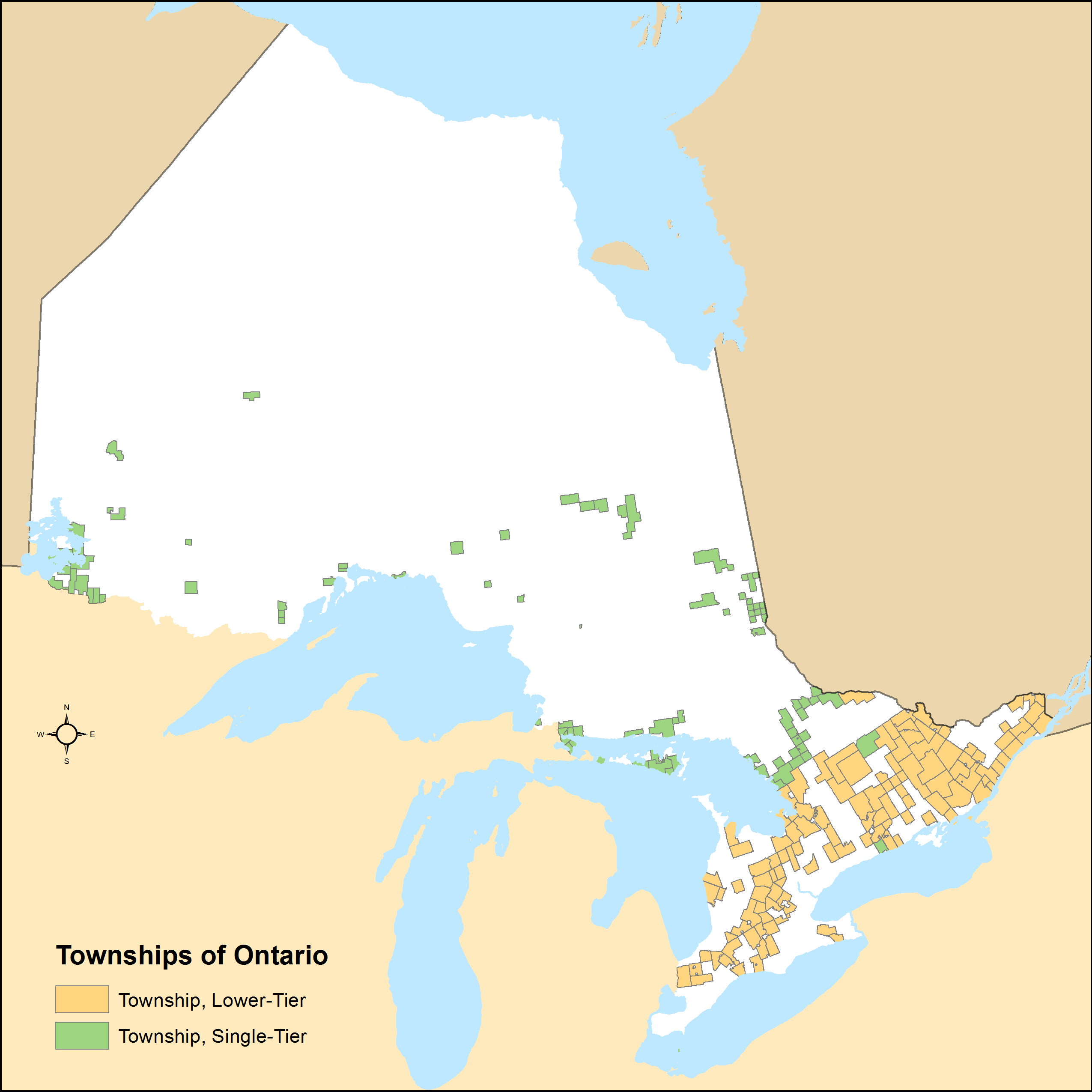
Ontario has 200 township municipalities of which 115 are lower-tier municipalities and 85 are single-tier municipalities

A township is a type of municipality in the Canadian province of Ontario. They can have either single-tier (not part of another higher tier government form, like a county) status or lower-tier (part of another higher tier government form, like a county) status.

Ontario has 200 townships that had a cumulative population of 990,396 and an average population of 4,952 in the 2011 Census. Ontario's largest and smallest townships are Centre Wellington and Cockburn Island with populations of 26,693 and 0 (Note: Actual population may not be 0 as Statistics Canada, to protect privacy, rounds population to the nearest 5 in the event a geographic area's actual population is less than 15.) respectively.

== History ==
Under the former Municipal Act, 1990, a township was a type of local municipality. Under this former legislation, a locality with a population of 1,000 or more could have been incorporated as a township by Ontario's Municipal Board upon review of an application from 75 or more residents of the locality. It also provided that a township could include "a union of townships and a municipality composed of two or more townships".

In the transition to the Municipal Act, 2001, these requirements were abandoned and, as at December 31, 2002, every township that:

- "existed and formed part of a county, a regional or district municipality or the County of Oxford for municipal purposes" became a lower-tier municipality yet retained its name as a township; and
- "existed and did not form part of a county, a regional or district municipality or the County of Oxford for municipal purposes" became a single-tier municipality yet retained its name as a township.

The current legislation also provides lower and single-tier municipalities with the authority to name themselves as "townships", or other former municipal status types such as "cities", "towns" or "villages", or generically as "municipalities".

== Township municipalities in Ontario ==
Township	Municipal status	Geographic area	Population (2011)	Population (2006)	Change (%)	Area (km^{2})	Population density
Addington Highlands	Lower-tier	Lennox and Addington	2,532	2,512	0.8	1,329.93	1.9
Adelaide-Metcalfe	Lower-tier	Middlesex	3,028	3,135	−3.4	331.38	9.1
Adjala-Tosorontio	Lower-tier	Simcoe	10,603	10,695	−0.9	372.39	28.5
Admaston/Bromley	Lower-tier	Renfrew	2,844	2,716	4.7	524.6	5.4
Alberton	Single-tier	Rainy River	864	958	−9.8	115.43	7.5
Alfred and Plantagenet	Lower-tier	Prescott and Russell	9,196	8,654	6.3	392.45	23.4
Algonquin Highlands	Lower-tier	Haliburton	2,156	1,976	9.1	1,004.76	2.1
Alnwick/Haldimand	Lower-tier	Northumberland	6,617	6,435	2.8	398.57	16.6
Amaranth	Lower-tier	Dufferin	3,963	3,845	3.1	264.5	15
The Archipelago	Single-tier	Parry Sound	566	576	−1.7	606.56	0.9
Armour	Single-tier	Parry Sound	1,372	1,249	9.8	164.44	8.3
Armstrong	Single-tier	Timiskaming	1,216	1,155	5.3	90.33	13.5
Ashfield-Colborne-Wawanosh	Lower-tier	Huron	5,582	5,409	3.2	587.08	9.5
Asphodel-Norwood	Lower-tier	Peterborough	4,041	4,247	−4.9	160.98	25.1
Assiginack	Single-tier	Manitoulin	960	914	5	227.87	4.2
Athens	Lower-tier	Leeds and Grenville	3,118	3,086	1	127.77	24.4
Augusta	Lower-tier	Leeds and Grenville	7,430	7,510	−1.1	314.73	23.6
Baldwin	Single-tier	Sudbury	551	554	−0.5	83.29	6.6
Beckwith	Lower-tier	Lanark	6,986	6,387	9.4	240.51	29
Billings	Single-tier	Manitoulin	506	539	−6.1	209.3	2.4
Black River-Matheson	Single-tier	Cochrane	2,410	2,619	−8	1,163.41	2.1
Blandford-Blenheim	Lower-tier	Oxford	7,359	7,149	2.9	382.28	19.3
Bonfield	Single-tier	Nipissing	2,016	1,981	1.8	208.43	9.7
Bonnechere Valley	Lower-tier	Renfrew	3,763	3,665	2.7	593.19	6.3
Brethour	Single-tier	Timiskaming	129	117	10.3	82.05	1.6
Brock	Lower-tier	Durham	11,341	11,979	−5.3	423.38	26.8
Brudenell, Lyndoch and Raglan	Lower-tier	Renfrew	1,658	1,497	10.8	705.83	2.3
Burpee and Mills	Single-tier	Manitoulin	308	329	−6.4	218.48	1.4
Carling	Single-tier	Parry Sound	1,248	1,123	11.1	248.56	5
Carlow/Mayo	Lower-tier	Hastings	892	950	−6.1	390.94	2.3
Casey	Single-tier	Timiskaming	374	385	−2.9	80.75	4.6
Cavan-Monaghan	Lower-tier	Peterborough	8,601	8,828	−2.6	306.22	28.1
Central Frontenac	Lower-tier	Frontenac	4,556	4,665	−2.3	1,025.17	4.4
Centre Wellington	Lower-tier	Wellington	26,693	26,049	2.5	407.53	65.5
Chamberlain	Single-tier	Timiskaming	297	322	−7.8	110.22	2.7
Champlain	Lower-tier	Prescott and Russell	8,573	8,683	−1.3	207.24	41.4
Chapleau	Single-tier	Sudbury	2,116	2,354	−10.1	14.27	148.3
Chapple	Single-tier	Rainy River	741	856	−13.4	529.02	1.4
Chatsworth	Lower-tier	Grey	6,437	6,392	0.7	596.18	10.8
Chisholm	Single-tier	Nipissing	1,263	1,318	−4.2	206.79	6.1
Clearview	Lower-tier	Simcoe	13,734	14,088	−2.5	557.44	24.6
Cockburn Island	Single-tier	Manitoulin	0	10	−100	171.04	0
Coleman	Single-tier	Timiskaming	597	540	10.6	178.82	3.3
Conmee	Single-tier	Thunder Bay	764	740	3.2	168.81	4.5
Cramahe	Lower-tier	Northumberland	6,073	5,950	2.1	201.98	30.1
Dawn-Euphemia	Lower-tier	Lambton	2,049	2,190	−6.4	445.13	4.6
Dawson	Single-tier	Rainy River	563	620	−9.2	338.35	1.7
Dorion	Single-tier	Thunder Bay	338	379	−10.8	212.12	1.6
Douro-Dummer	Lower-tier	Peterborough	6,805	6,954	−2.1	458.98	14.8
Drummond/North Elmsley	Lower-tier	Lanark	7,487	7,118	5.2	366.03	20.5
Dubreuilville	Single-tier	Algoma	635	773	−17.9	89.57	7.1
Dysart, Dudley, Harcourt, Guilford, Harburn, Bruton, Havelock, Eyre and Clyde	Lower-tier	Haliburton	5,966	5,526	8	1,483.51	4
Ear Falls	Single-tier	Kenora	1,026	1,153	−11	331.03	3.1
East Ferris	Single-tier	Nipissing	4,766	4,228	12.7	155.03	30.7
East Garafraxa	Lower-tier	Dufferin	2,595	2,389	8.6	166.04	15.6
East Hawkesbury	Lower-tier	Prescott and Russell	3,335	3,368	−1	235.18	14.2
East Zorra-Tavistock	Lower-tier	Oxford	6,836	7,008	−2.5	242.3	28.2
Edwardsburgh/Cardinal	Lower-tier	Leeds and Grenville	6,959	6,689	4	312.34	22.3
Elizabethtown-Kitley	Lower-tier	Leeds and Grenville	9,724	10,201	−4.7	557.8	17.4
Emo	Single-tier	Rainy River	1,252	1,305	−4.1	203.54	6.2
Enniskillen	Lower-tier	Lambton	2,930	3,122	−6.1	338.18	8.7
Essa	Lower-tier	Simcoe	18,505	16,901	9.5	280.07	66.1
Evanturel	Single-tier	Timiskaming	452	473	−4.4	88.99	5.1
Faraday	Lower-tier	Hastings	1,468	1,578	−7	217.97	6.7
Fauquier-Strickland	Single-tier	Cochrane	530	568	−6.7	1,013.9	0.5
Front of Yonge	Lower-tier	Leeds and Grenville	2,752	2,803	−4.4	128.47	20.9
Frontenac Islands	Lower-tier	Frontenac	1,864	1,862	0.1	175.04	10.6
Gauthier	Single-tier	Timiskaming	123	133	−7.5	88.59	1.4
Georgian Bay	Lower-tier	Muskoka	2,482	2,340	6.1	546.97	4.5
Georgian Bluffs	Lower-tier	Grey	10,404	10,506	−1	604.36	17.2
Gillies	Single-tier	Thunder Bay	473	544	−13.1	93.02	5.1
Greater Madawaska	Lower-tier	Renfrew	2,485	2,751	−9.7	1,034.33	2.4
Guelph/Eramosa	Lower-tier	Wellington	12,380	12,066	2.6	291.71	42.4
Hamilton	Lower-tier	Northumberland	10,702	10,972	−2.5	256.12	41.8
Harley	Single-tier	Timiskaming	539	551	−2.2	91.73	5.9
Harris	Single-tier	Timiskaming	523	512	2.1	50.17	10.4
Havelock-Belmont-Methuen	Lower-tier	Peterborough	4,523	4,637	−2.5	543.59	8.3
Head, Clara and Maria	Lower-tier	Renfrew	235	228	3.1	728.15	0.3
Hilliard	Single-tier	Timiskaming	204	222	−8.1	91.18	2.2
Hilton	Single-tier	Algoma	261	243	7.4	115.78	2.3
Hornepayne	Single-tier	Algoma	1,050	1,209	−13.2	204.52	5.1
Horton	Lower-tier	Renfrew	2,719	2,803	−3	158.53	17.2
Howick	Lower-tier	Huron	3,856	3,882	−0.7	287.18	13.4
Hudson	Single-tier	Timiskaming	476	455	4.6	90.64	5.3
Huron-Kinloss	Lower-tier	Bruce	6,790	6,515	4.2	440.63	15.4
Ignace	Single-tier	Kenora	1,202	1,431	−16	72.66	16.5
James	Single-tier	Timiskaming	424	414	2.4	86.19	4.9
Jocelyn	Single-tier	Algoma	237	277	−14.4	131.37	1.8
Johnson	Single-tier	Algoma	750	701	7	120.38	6.2
Joly	Single-tier	Parry Sound	284	280	1.4	194.33	1.5
Kerns	Single-tier	Timiskaming	359	325	10.5	90.44	4
Killaloe, Hagarty and Richards	Lower-tier	Renfrew	2,402	2,550	−5.8	395.98	6.1
King	Lower-tier	York	19,899	19,487	2.1	333.3	59.7
La Vallee	Single-tier	Rainy River	988	1,067	−7.4	237.5	4.2
Laird	Single-tier	Algoma	1,057	1,078	−1.9	102.43	10.3
Lake of Bays	Lower-tier	Muskoka	3,506	3,570	−1.8	677.58	5.2
Lake of the Woods	Single-tier	Rainy River	296	323	−8.4	751.95	0.4
Lanark Highlands	Lower-tier	Lanark	5,128	5,180	−1	1,048.19	4.9
Larder Lake	Single-tier	Timiskaming	684	735	−6.9	229.65	3
Laurentian Valley	Lower-tier	Renfrew	9,657	9,265	4.2	552.44	17.5
Leeds and the Thousand Islands	Lower-tier	Leeds and Grenville	9,277	9,435	−1.7	612.51	15.1
Limerick	Lower-tier	Hastings	352	364	−3.3	205.68	1.7
Loyalist	Lower-tier	Lennox and Addington	16,221	15,062	7.7	341.04	47.6
Lucan Biddulph	Lower-tier	Middlesex	4,338	4,187	3.6	169.15	25.6
Macdonald, Meredith and Aberdeen Additional	Single-tier	Algoma	1,464	1,550	−5.5	163.52	9
Machar	Single-tier	Parry Sound	923	866	6.6	184.62	5
Machin	Single-tier	Kenora	935	978	−4.4	289.84	3.2
Madawaska Valley	Lower-tier	Renfrew	4,282	4,381	−2.3	671.85	6.4
Madoc	Lower-tier	Hastings	2,197	2,069	6.2	277.97	7.9
Malahide	Lower-tier	Elgin	9,146	8,828	3.6	395.08	23.2
Manitouwadge	Single-tier	Thunder Bay	2,105	2,300	−8.5	352.06	6
Mapleton	Lower-tier	Wellington	9,989	9,851	1.4	534.81	18.7
Matachewan	Single-tier	Timiskaming	409	375	9.1	543.63	0.8
Mattawan	Single-tier	Nipissing	162	147	10.2	200.96	0.8
Mattice-Val Côté	Single-tier	Cochrane	686	772	−11.1	414.64	1.7
McDougall	Single-tier	Parry Sound	2,705	2,704	0	268.3	10.1
McGarry	Single-tier	Timiskaming	595	674	−11.7	86.72	6.9
McKellar	Single-tier	Parry Sound	1,144	1,080	5.9	181.12	6.3
McMurrich/Monteith	Single-tier	Parry Sound	779	791	−1.5	278.13	2.8
McNab/Braeside	Lower-tier	Renfrew	7,371	7,222	2.1	255.74	28.8
Melancthon	Lower-tier	Dufferin	2,839	2,895	−1.9	310.96	9.1
Minden Hills	Lower-tier	Haliburton	5,655	5,556	1.8	878.17	6.4
Montague	Lower-tier	Lanark	3,483	3,209	8.5	279.74	12.5
Moonbeam	Single-tier	Cochrane	1,101	1,298	−15.2	235.65	4.7
Morley	Single-tier	Rainy River	474	492	−3.7	375.61	1.3
Mulmur	Lower-tier	Dufferin	3,391	3,318	2.2	286.73	11.8
Muskoka Lakes	Lower-tier	Muskoka	6,707	6,467	3.7	794.48	8.4
Nairn and Hyman	Single-tier	Sudbury	477	493	−3.2	160.94	3
Nipigon	Single-tier	Thunder Bay	1,631	1,752	−6.9	109.14	14.9
Nipissing	Single-tier	Parry Sound	1,704	1,642	3.8	393.6	4.3
North Algona Wilberforce	Lower-tier	Renfrew	2,873	2,840	1.2	378.53	7.6
North Dumfries	Lower-tier	Waterloo	9,334	9,063	3	187.44	49.8
North Dundas	Lower-tier	Stormont, Dundas and Glengarry	11,225	11,095	1.2	503.21	22.3
North Frontenac	Lower-tier	Frontenac	1,842	1,904	−3.3	1,164.73	1.6
North Glengarry	Lower-tier	Stormont, Dundas and Glengarry	10,251	10,635	−3.6	643.69	15.9
North Huron	Lower-tier	Huron	4,884	5,015	−2.6	178.98	27.3
North Kawartha	Lower-tier	Peterborough	2,289	2,342	−2.3	776.04	2.9
The North Shore	Single-tier	Algoma	509	549	−7.3	238.94	2.1
North Stormont	Lower-tier	Stormont, Dundas and Glengarry	6,775	6,769	0.1	515.65	13.1
Norwich	Lower-tier	Oxford	10,721	10,481	2.3	431.28	24.9
O'Connor	Single-tier	Thunder Bay	685	720	−4.9	108.65	6.3
Opasatika	Single-tier	Cochrane	214	280	−23.6	329.98	0.6
Oro-Medonte	Lower-tier	Simcoe	20,078	20,031	0.2	586.9	34.2
Otonabee-South Monaghan	Lower-tier	Peterborough	6,660	6,812	−2.2	347.58	19.2
Papineau-Cameron	Single-tier	Nipissing	978	1,058	−7.6	566.74	1.7
Pelee	Single-tier	Essex	171	287	−40.4	41.79	4.1
Perry	Single-tier	Parry Sound	2,317	2,010	15.3	187.25	12.4
Perth East	Lower-tier	Perth	12,028	11,986	0.4	713.39	16.9
Perth South	Lower-tier	Perth	3,993	4,132	−3.4	393.03	10.2
Pickle Lake	Single-tier	Kenora	425	479	−11.3	255.08	1.7
Plummer Additional	Single-tier	Algoma	650	625	4	221.97	2.9
Prince	Single-tier	Algoma	1,031	971	6.2	85.31	12.1
Puslinch	Lower-tier	Wellington	7,029	6,689	5.1	214.61	32.8
Ramara	Lower-tier	Simcoe	9,275	9,427	−1.6	419.25	22.1
Red Rock	Single-tier	Thunder Bay	942	1,063	−11.4	62.93	15
Rideau Lakes	Lower-tier	Leeds and Grenville	10,207	10,350	−1.4	729.09	14
Russell	Lower-tier	Prescott and Russell	15,247	13,883	9.8	199.06	76.6
Ryerson	Single-tier	Parry Sound	634	686	−7.6	188.07	3.4
Sables-Spanish Rivers	Single-tier	Sudbury	3,075	3,237	−5	815.8	3.8
Schreiber	Single-tier	Thunder Bay	1,126	901	25	36.79	30.6
Scugog	Lower-tier	Durham	21,569	21,439	0.6	474.65	45.4
Seguin	Single-tier	Parry Sound	3,988	4,276	−6.7	595.42	6.7
Selwyn	Lower-tier	Peterborough	16,846	17,027	−1.1	315.64	53.4
Severn	Lower-tier	Simcoe	12,377	12,030	2.9	549.9	22.5
Sioux Narrows-Nestor Falls	Single-tier	Kenora	720	672	7.1	1,222.43	0.6
South Algonquin	Single-tier	Nipissing	1,211	1,253	−3.4	872.49	1.4
South Frontenac	Lower-tier	Frontenac	18,113	18,227	−0.6	971.68	18.6
South Glengarry	Lower-tier	Stormont, Dundas and Glengarry	13,162	12,880	2.2	605.3	21.7
South Stormont	Lower-tier	Stormont, Dundas and Glengarry	12,617	12,520	0.8	447.5	28.2
Southgate	Lower-tier	Grey	7,190	7,072	1.7	644.35	11.2
South-West Oxford	Lower-tier	Oxford	7,544	7,589	−0.6	370.48	20.4
Southwold	Lower-tier	Elgin	4,494	4,724	−4.9	301.71	14.9
Springwater	Lower-tier	Simcoe	18,223	17,456	4.4	536.23	34
St. Clair	Lower-tier	Lambton	14,515	14,649	−0.9	619.32	23.4
St. Joseph	Single-tier	Algoma	1,201	1,129	6.4	129.36	9.3
Stirling-Rawdon	Lower-tier	Hastings	4,978	4,906	1.5	282.31	17.6
Stone Mills	Lower-tier	Lennox and Addington	7,560	7,568	−0.1	708.83	10.7
Strathroy-Caradoc	Lower-tier	Middlesex	20,978	19,959	5.1	274.12	76.5
Strong	Single-tier	Parry Sound	1,341	1,327	1.1	159.28	8.4
Tarbutt	Single-tier	Algoma	396	388	2.1	53.14	7.5
Tay	Lower-tier	Simcoe	9,736	9,748	−0.1	139	70
Tay Valley	Lower-tier	Lanark	5,571	5,634	−1.1	549.12	10.1
Tehkummah	Single-tier	Manitoulin	406	382	6.3	132.48	3.1
Terrace Bay	Single-tier	Thunder Bay	1,471	1,625	−9.5	151.04	9.7
Tiny	Lower-tier	Simcoe	11,232	10,754	4.4	336.83	33.3
Tudor and Cashel	Lower-tier	Hastings	586	682	−14.1	445.67	1.3
Tyendinaga	Lower-tier	Hastings	4,150	4,070	2	313	13.3
Uxbridge	Lower-tier	Durham	20,623	19,169	7.6	420.83	49
Val Rita-Harty	Single-tier	Cochrane	817	939	−13	382.71	2.1
Wainfleet	Lower-tier	Niagara	6,356	6,601	−3.7	217.29	29.3
Warwick	Lower-tier	Lambton	3,717	3,945	−5.8	290.2	12.8
Wellesley	Lower-tier	Waterloo	10,713	9,789	9.4	277.79	38.6
Wellington North	Lower-tier	Wellington	11,477	11,175	2.7	526.28	21.8
West Lincoln	Lower-tier	Niagara	13,837	13,167	5.1	387.78	35.7
White River	Single-tier	Algoma	607	841	−27.8	96.94	6.3
Whitewater Region	Lower-tier	Renfrew	6,921	6,631	4.4	537.96	12.9
Wilmot	Lower-tier	Waterloo	19,223	17,097	12.4	263.72	72.9
Wollaston	Lower-tier	Hastings	708	730	−3	220.19	3.2
Woolwich	Lower-tier	Waterloo	23,145	19,658	17.7	326.17	71
Zorra	Lower-tier	Oxford	8,058	8,125	−0.8	528.99	15.2
Total			990,396	974,532	1.6	73,758.34	13.4
Total lower-tier			910,397	892,282	2	52,432.34	17.4
Total single-tier			79,999	82,250	−2.7	21,326	3.8

== Former township municipalities ==
Former township	Change date	Change event	Current status	Remarks
Barrie Island	January 1, 2009	Dissolution	—	Amalgamated into Gordon/Barrie Island
Dack	January 1, 2003	Dissolution	—	Amalgamated into Charlton and Dack
Delhi	January 1, 2001	Dissolution	—	Amalgamated into Norfolk County
Dymond	January 1, 2004	Dissolution	—	Amalgamated into Temiskaming Shores
Glanbrook	January 1, 2001	Dissolution	—	Amalgamated into Hamilton
Gordon	January 1, 2009	Dissolution	—	Amalgamated into Gordon/Barrie Island
Goulbourn	January 1, 2001	Dissolution	—	Amalgamated into Ottawa
Marlborough	1974			Amalgamated into Rideau Township
Marmora and Lake	March 14, 2001	Status change	Municipality	
Michipicoten	June 5, 2007	Status and name change	Municipality	Name changed to Wawa
Norfolk	January 1, 2001	Dissolution	—	Amalgamated into Norfolk County
North Gower	1974	Dissolution		Amalgamated into Rideau Township
North Grenville	July 14, 2003	Status change	Municipality	
North Himsworth	June 2, 2002	Status and name change	Municipality	Named changed to Callander
Osgoode	January 1, 2001	Dissolution	—	Amalgamated into Ottawa
Rideau	January 1, 2001	Dissolution	—	Amalgamated into Ottawa
Shedden	October 1, 2004	Status and name change	Town	Name changed to Spanish
Shuniah	January 2, 2011	Status change	Municipality	
West Carleton	January 1, 2001	Dissolution	—	Amalgamated into Ottawa
West Grey	December 2, 2002	Status change	Municipality	

== See also ==
- List of cities in Ontario
- List of communities in Ontario
- List of municipalities in Ontario
- List of towns in Ontario
- List of townships in Ontario (includes historical townships)
- List of villages in Ontario
