= Billings, Ontario =

Billings
- Township (single-tier)
- Township of Billings
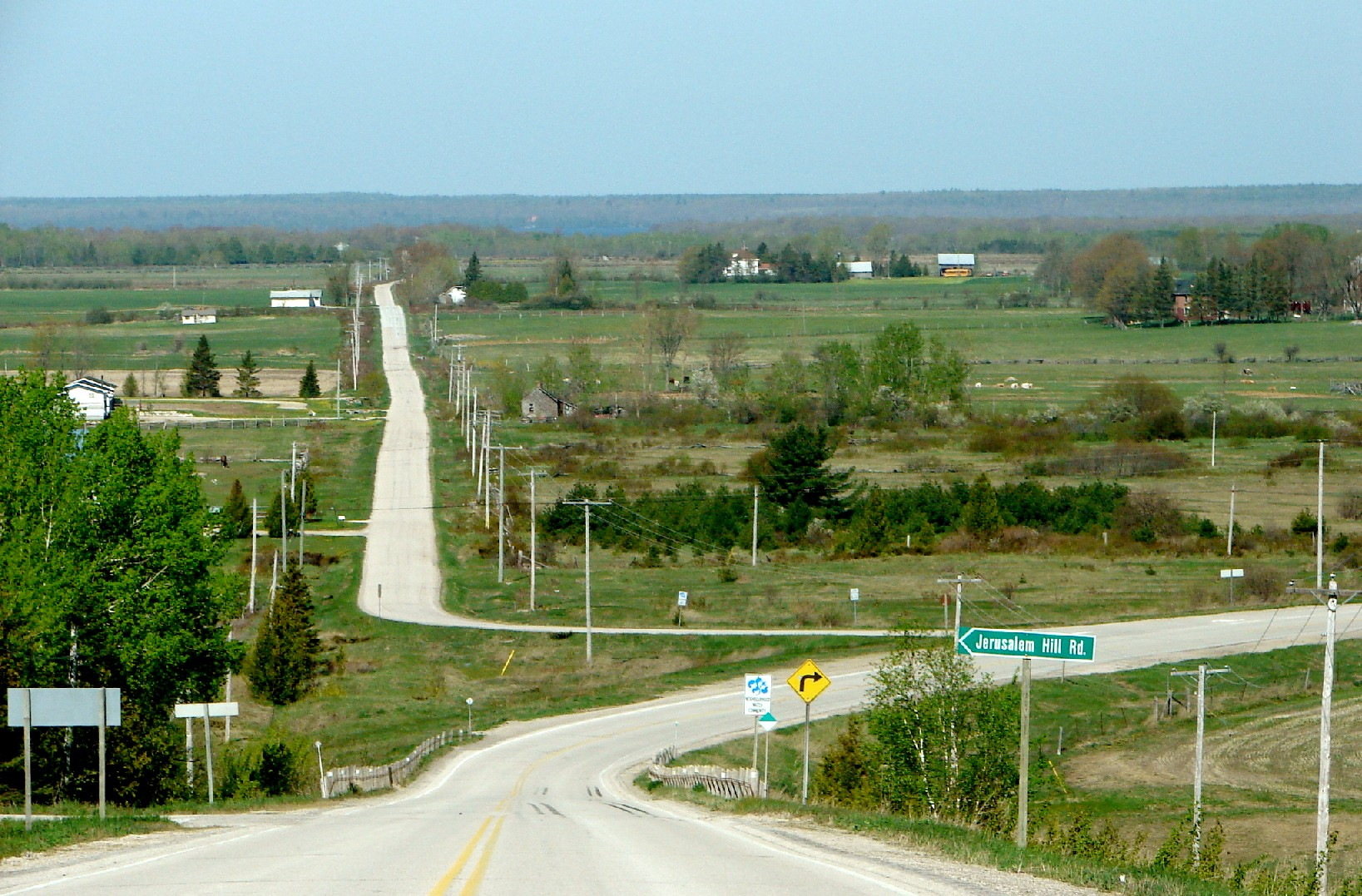

- Location within Manitoulin District Location within Ontario
- Coordinates: 45°54′N 82°15′W
- Country: Canada
- Province: Ontario
- District: Manitoulin
- Incorporated: 1884

Government
  - Type: Township
  - Mayor: Bryan William Barker
  - MP: Jim Belanger (Conservative)
  - MPP: Bill Rosenberg (PC)

Area
  - Land: 208.81 km^{2} (80.62 sq mi)

Population (2021)
  - Total: 753
  - Density: 3.6/km^{2} (9.3/sq mi)
- Time zone: UTC-5 (EST)
  - Summer (DST): UTC-4 (EDT)
- Postal code: P0P 1J0
- Area codes: 705, 249
- Website: www.billingstwp.ca

Billings is a township in the Canadian province of Ontario, as well as the name of a community within that township.

Located in the Manitoulin District, the township had a population of 753 in the 2021 Canadian census. It is named after Elkanah Billings.

== Communities ==
The primary community in the township is Kagawong. There are three smaller communities: Billings, Bowser's Corner, and Pleasant Valley.

=== Kagawong ===
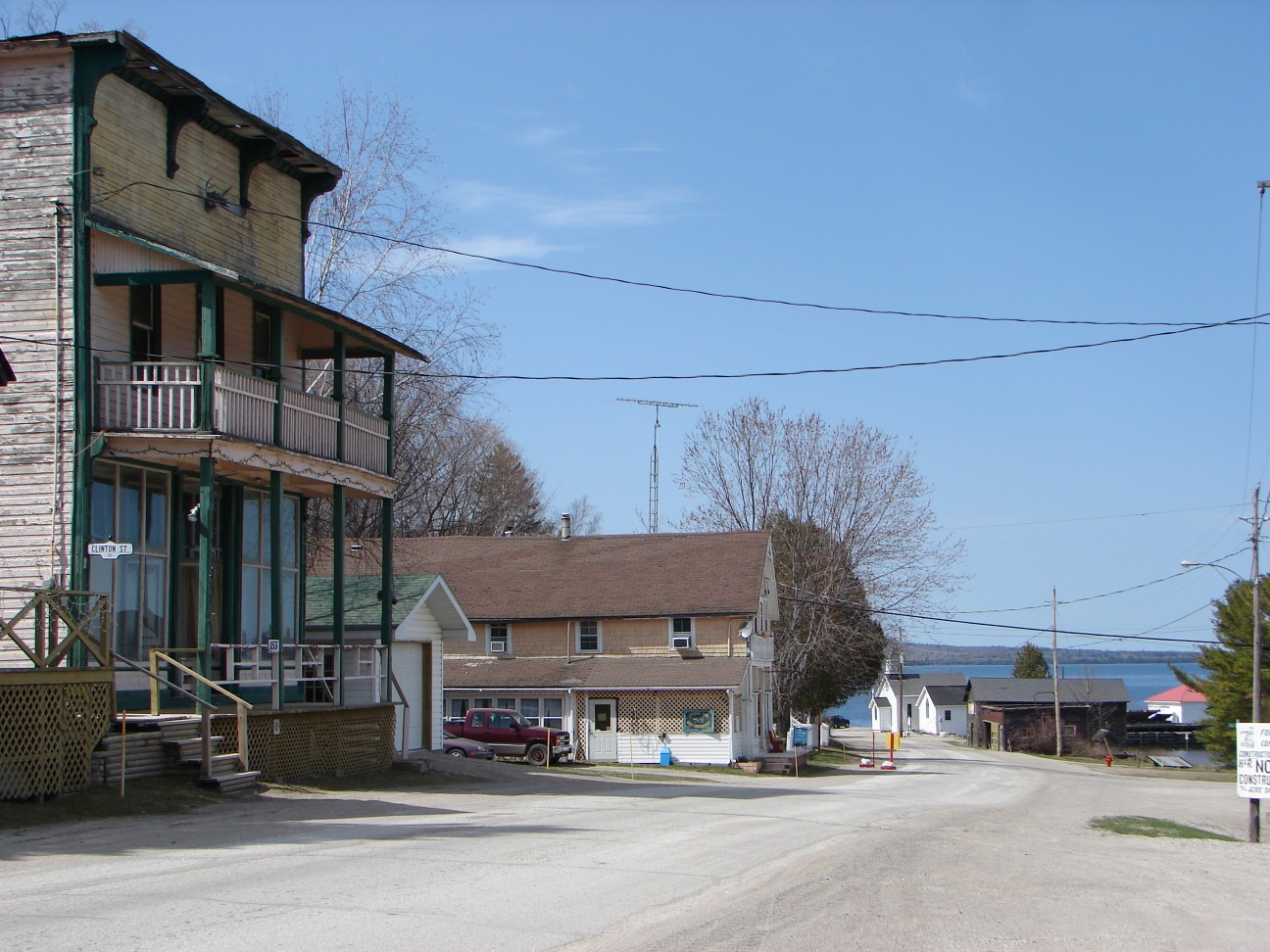
The waterfront of Kagawong

Kagawong's harbour is located on Mudge Bay and is home to the Kagawong Lighthouse, which has been in continuous service since 1888. The name Kagawong means "where mists rise from falling waters" in the Ojibwe language, a reference to the nearby Bridal Veil Falls on the Kagawong River.

Kagawong is home to numerous tourist attractions. The most popular being the famed Bridal Veil Falls. The legend is that those who swim under the falls are rewarded with good luck. The falls begin at the end of the upper Kagawong river, and flow past a series of small, cascading waterfalls down a winding trail towards Mudge Bay. The trails are spotted with art pieces, benches and picnic tables. In addition to the falls, Kagawong is also home to a Transportation and Communication Museum, Art Gallery, Anglican Church, several sandy beaches, and many camping and cottage rental opportunities.

Kagawong is the nearest port of call to the islands of the North Channel, being directly south of Clapperton Island and the Benjamin Islands.

== Demographics ==
In the 2021 Census of Population conducted by Statistics Canada, Billings had a population of 753 living in 343 of its 675 total private dwellings, a change of 24.9% from its 2016 population of 603. With a land area of 208.81 km^{2} (80.62 sq mi), it had a population density of 3.6/km^{2} (9.3/sq mi) in 2021.

Canada census – Billings community profile

	2021	2016	2011
Population	753 (+24.9% from 2016)	603 (+19.2% from 2011)	506 (-6.1% from 2006)
Land area	208.81 km^{2} (80.62 sq mi)	209.64 km^{2} (80.94 sq mi)	209.30 km^{2} (80.81 sq mi)
Population density	3.6/km^{2} (9.3/sq mi)	2.9/km^{2} (7.5/sq mi)	2.4/km^{2} (6.2/sq mi)
Median age	56.8 (M: 57.2, F: 56.8)	51.4 (M: 50.9, F: 51.9)
Private dwellings	675 (total) 343 (occupied)	731 (total)	704 (total)
Median household income	$81,000	$68,779

References: 2021 2016 2011

Historical census populations – Billings, Ontario

Year	Pop.	±%
1881	584	—
1891	635	+8.7%
1901	751	+18.3%
1911	535	−28.8%
1921	369	−31.0%
1931	408	+10.6%
1941	397	−2.7%
1951	369	−7.1%

Year	Pop.	±%
1956	353	−4.3%
1961	385	+9.1%
1966	370	−3.9%
1971	398	+7.6%
1976	437	+9.8%
1981	394	−9.8%
1986	353	−10.4%
1991	435	+23.2%

Year	Pop.	±%
1996	538	+23.7%
2001	551	+2.4%
2006	539	−2.2%
2011	506	−6.1%
2016	603	+19.2%
2021	753	+24.9%

Source: Statistics Canada

Mother tongue (2021):

- English as first language: 85.4 %
- French as first language: 9.9 %
- English and French as first language: 0 %
- Other as first language: 3.3 %

== Transportation ==
Highway 540 is the main road in the township and provides connections to Gore Bay and Mindemoya.

== See also ==
- List of francophone communities in Ontario
- List of townships in Ontario
