= Unorganized West Manitoulin District =

- Unorganized area
- Manitoulin, Unorganized, West Part
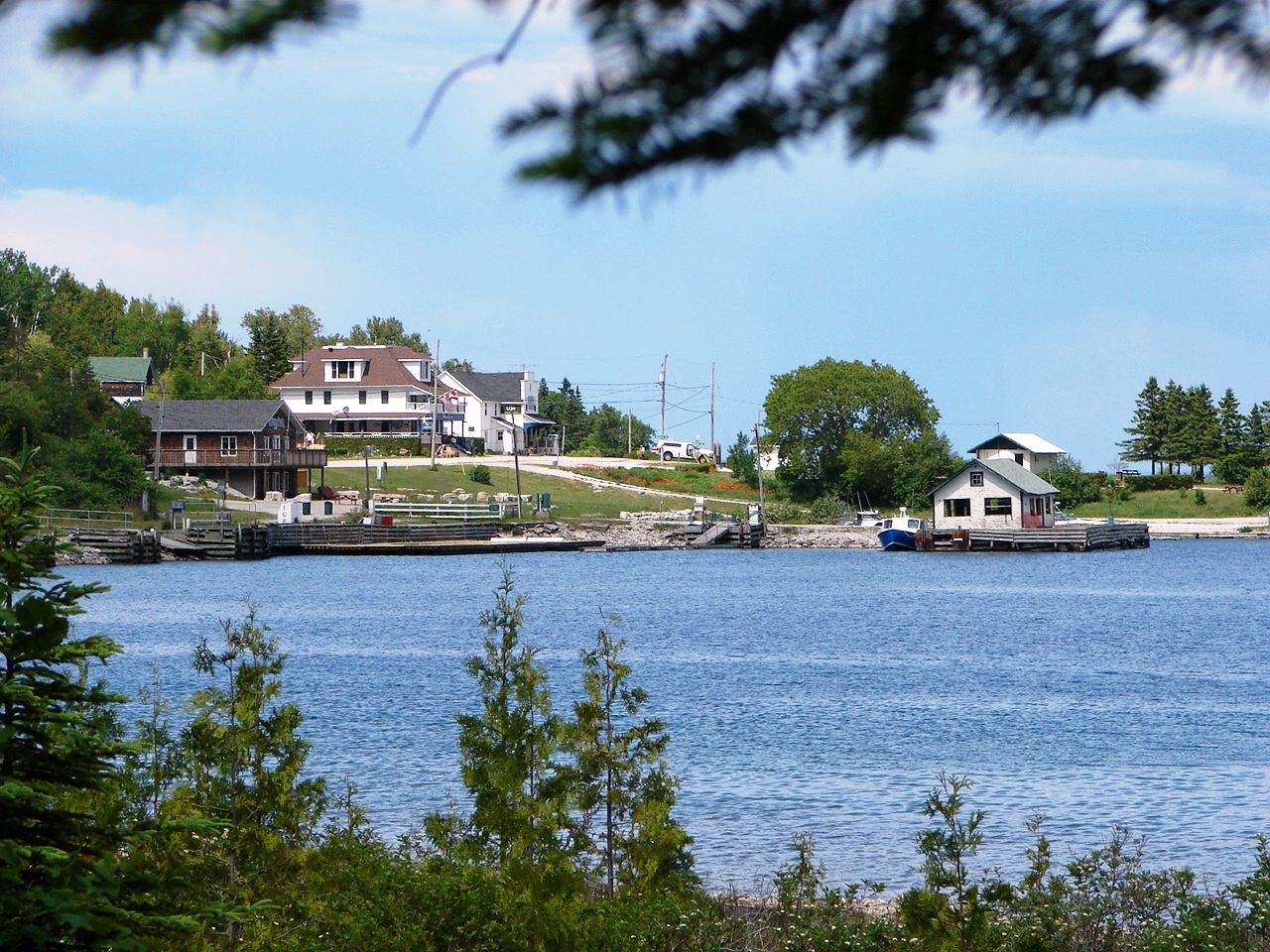
- Meldrum Bay

- Location within Manitoulin District Location within Ontario
- Coordinates: 45°52′N 83°00′W
- Country: Canada
- Province: Ontario
- District: Manitoulin

Government
  - Federal riding: Sudbury East—Manitoulin—Nickel Belt
  - Prov. riding: Algoma—Manitoulin

Area
  - Land: 402.29 km^{2} (155.33 sq mi)

Population (2021)
  - Total: 219
  - Density: 0.5/km^{2} (1.3/sq mi)
- Time zone: UTC-5 (EST)
  - Summer (DST): UTC-4 (EDT)
- Postal Code: P0P 1R0, P0P 1Y0
- Area code: 705

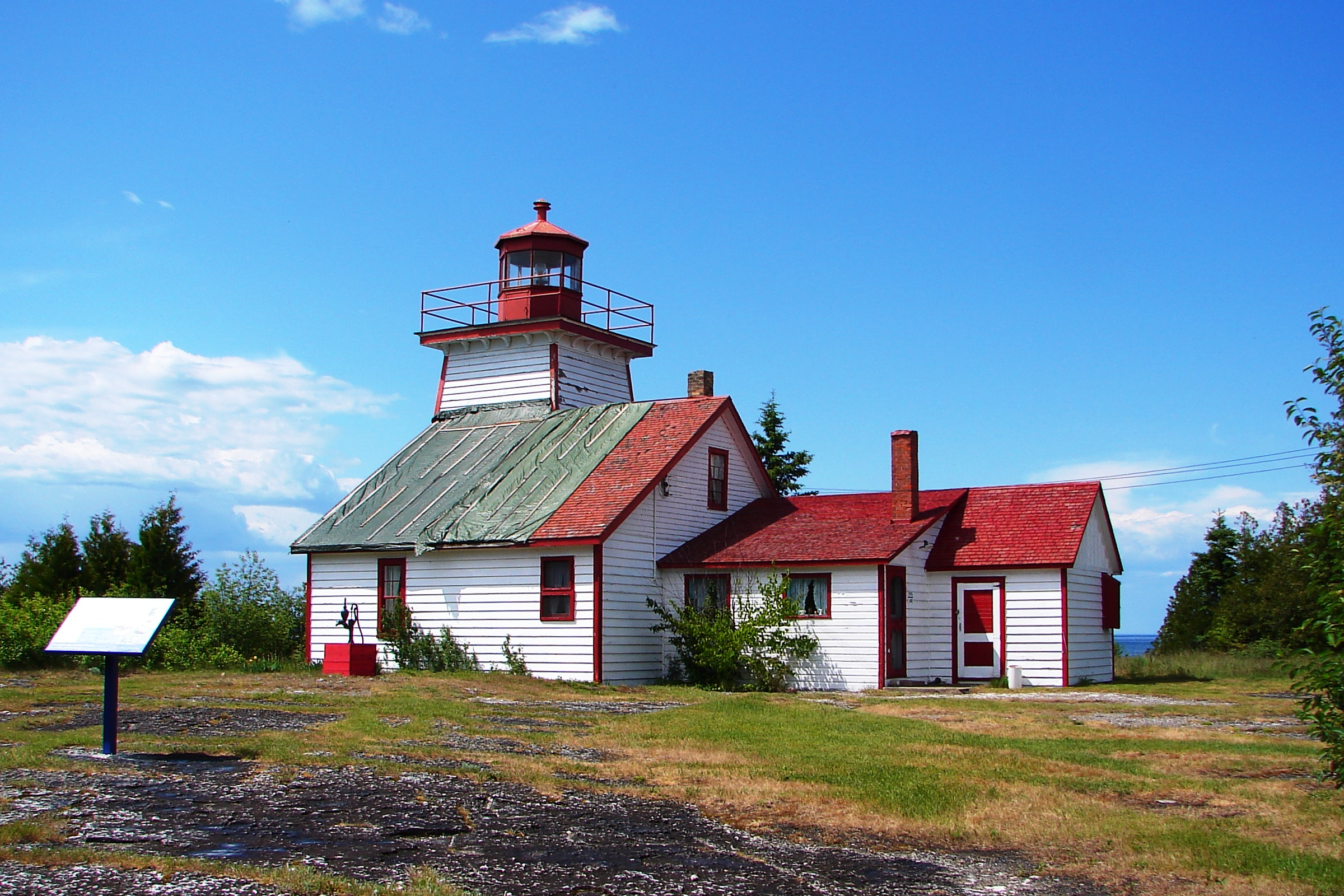
Mississagi Strait Lighthouse

Unorganized West Part Manitoulin District is an unorganized area in Manitoulin District in northeastern Ontario, Canada, encompassing the portion of Manitoulin Island which is not part of an incorporated municipality. It comprises the geographic townships of Robinson and Dawson.

Separate local services boards provide services in Robinson and Dawson townships.

== Communities ==
The division includes the communities of Burnt Island, Cook's Dock, Fernlee, Meldrum Bay, and Silver Water.

=== Meldrum Bay ===
Meldrum Bay (45°55′39″N 83°06′53″W) is located at the western terminus of Highway 540, 72 kilometres (45 mi) west of Gore Bay. Settled in the 1870s by Scottish people from southern Ontario, and named after the namesake bay on which it is located, Meldrum Bay developed as a commercial fishing and lumbering centre. Its first mill opened in 1880. Once the village was home to stores, hotels, blacksmiths, school, and boarding houses, as well as a busy fishing fleet and Great Lakes steamers tied up at the docks.

From the 1920s, steamers of the Owen Sound Transportation Company provided weekly ferry service between Meldrum Bay and Thessalon, on its route between Owen Sound and Sault Ste. Marie, Ontario. However, the 1962 opening of the Trans-Canada Highway, and other road improvements, made this service unprofitable. Now during the summer, the docks are busy again, lined with pleasure craft from around the Great Lakes. This area holds some of the best chinook salmon fishing in all of Canada.

Many residents of the area are employed by Lafarge, whose quarry west of Meldrum Bay produces dolomite used in concrete, road construction and metallurgical processing. This Lafarge Canada site opened in the 1980s and is the home of the "largest Canadian marine quarry," with loading docks on the Mississagi Strait.

=== Silver Water ===
Silver Water (45°51′27″N 82°51′26″W) is located on Highway 540 approximately 42 kilometres (26 mi) west of Gore Bay. Named after, or around the same time as, nearby Silver Lake, it has a year-round population of approximately 62 families, which almost doubles during the summer months. It is a vibrant rural community, with the majority of the population being retired seniors. The community contains a well equipped community center as well as a popular country-style diner, both of which are well used community gathering sites. Silver Water has an all volunteer fire department, servicing the Robinson geographic township, consisting of 1 pumper and 2 tankers. This helps in keeping the residents homeowners insurance rates down. Silver Water also has a very active membership in the local United Church.

== Demographics ==
Canada census – Manitoulin, Unorganized, West Part – community profile

	2021	2016	2011
Population	219 (+29.6% from 2016)	169 (+5.6% from 2011)	160 (-27.9% from 2006)
Land area	402.29 km^{2} (155.33 sq mi)	407.67 km^{2} (157.40 sq mi)	407.54 km^{2} (157.35 sq mi)
Population density	0.5/km^{2} (1.3/sq mi)	0.4/km^{2} (1.0/sq mi)	0.4/km^{2} (1.0/sq mi)
Median age	63.2 (M: 62.4, F: 65.0)	65.9 (M: 67.3, F: 64.4)
Private dwellings	367 (total) 123 (occupied)	332 (total) 102 (occupied)	360 (total)
Median household income	$.n/a	$44,672

References: 2021 2016 2011

Historical census populations – Manitoulin, Unorganized, West Part

Year	Pop.	±%
1976	255	—
1981	228	−10.6%
1986	217	−4.8%
1991	244	+12.4%
1996	245	+0.4%

Year	Pop.	±%
2001	204	−16.7%
2006	222	+8.8%
2011	160	−27.9%
2016	169	+5.6%
2021	219	+29.6%

Population counts are not adjusted for boundary changes.
Source: Statistics Canada

== See also ==
- List of townships in Ontario
