= Chaw =

Chaw may refer to:

- Chaw (surname), a Cantonese romanization of the Chinese surname Cao
- Chaw (film), a 2009 Korean film
- Chewing tobacco, slang
- Chaw, a 2001 album by Chandrabindoo
- CHAW-FM, a country radio station based out of Little Current, Ontario
