= 542 (disambiguation) =

542 may refer to:

- 542 (year)
- 542 (number)
- List of highways numbered 542
