= Gibraltar, Ontario =

Gibraltar, Ontario can mean the following places:

- Gibraltar, Grey County, Ontario
- Gibraltar, Manitoulin District, Ontario
