= List of highways numbered 542 =

The following highways are numbered 542:

== Canada ==
- Alberta Highway 542
- Manitoba Provincial Road 542
- Ontario Highway 542
  - Ontario Highway 542A

== Germany ==
- Bundesautobahn 542

== United States ==
- MD 542
- CR 542
- SR 542
- PR-542
- SR 542

Preceded by 541	Lists of highways 542	Succeeded by 543
