= UT =

UT, Ut or ut may refer to:

== Arts and media ==
=== Music ===
- Ut, a musical note in Solfège which was replaced by do
- Ut (band), a 1980s No Wave rock band
- Ugly Things, a music magazine
- Unbelievable Truth, a 1990s indie-pop band
- Uncle Tupelo, an alternative country band

=== Other media ===
- UT (comics), a series of adult humour comic strips published in the UK
- The San Diego Union-Tribune, a U.S. newspaper
- Universal translator, in science fiction
- Unreal Tournament, a first-person shooter video game by Epic Games
- Undertale, a role-playing video game

== Places ==
- Utah, a United States state identified by postal abbreviation
- Uttarakhand, a state of northern India (ISO 3166-2 code)
- Union territory, an administrative division in India
- Unorganized territory (disambiguation), a country subdivision

== Universities ==
=== Asia ===
- University of Taipei, Taiwan
- University of Tehran, Iran
- Universitas Terbuka, Indonesia
- University of Tokushima, Japan
- University of Tokyo, Japan
- University of Toyama, Japan
- University of Tsukuba, Japan

=== Europe ===
- University of Tartu, Estonia
- University of Tirana, Albania
- University of Twente, Netherlands

=== North America ===
- University of Tampa, U.S.
- University of Tennessee, U.S.
- University of Texas at Austin, U.S.
- University of Texas System (UT System), U.S.
- University of Toledo, U.S.
- University of Toronto, Canada
- Universidad del Turabo, Puerto Rico, U.S.
- University of Utah, U.S.
- Utah Tech University, U.S.

== Other uses ==
- Aion UT, a battery electric compact hatchback
- Microtesla (μT), unit of magnetic flux density
- Nick Ut, Pulitzer Prize winning photographer known for The Terror of War
- UTair Aviation (IATA code: UT), a Russian airline
- Union de Transports Aériens, IATA code UT until 1992
- Ultrasonic testing, testing based on the propagation of ultrasonic waves
- Unity Technologies, developer of the Unity game engine
- Universal Time, a standard time scale
- Utilitiesman (United States Navy), a Seabee occupational rating
- Urea transporter, a membrane transport protein transporting urea
