= List of highways numbered 541 =

The following highways are numbered 541:

== United Kingdom ==
- A541 road

== United States ==
- US 541 (former)
- LA 541
- MD 541 (former)
- MS 541
- PR-541
- SC 541
- FM 541

Preceded by 540	Lists of highways 541	Succeeded by 542
