= Coleman, Ontario =

Coleman
- Township municipality (single-tier)
- Township of Coleman
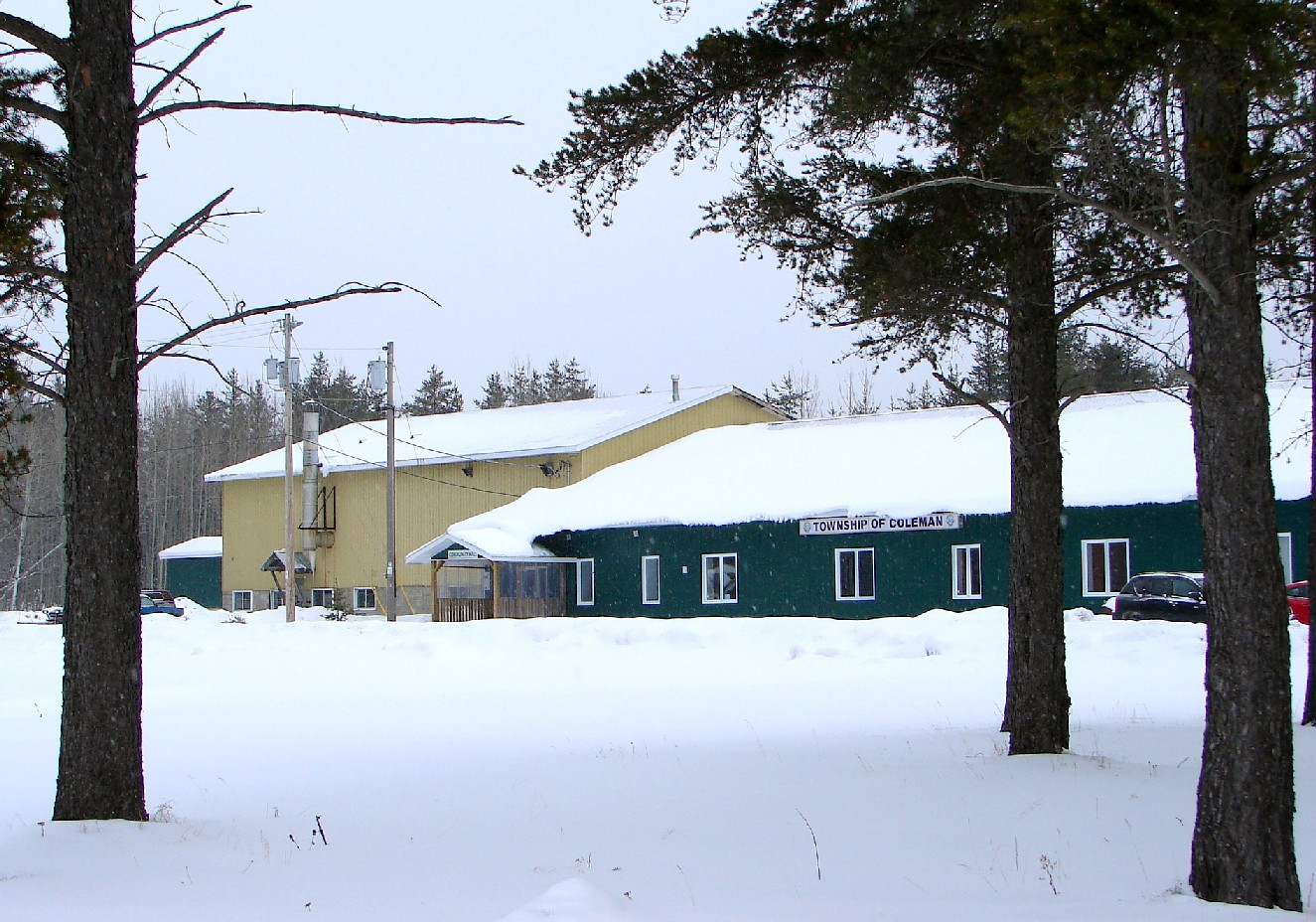
- Municipal building
- Motto: Over 2 billion square feet of opportunity!
- Location within Ontario
- Coordinates: 47°22′03″N 79°45′34″W
- Country: Canada
- Province: Ontario
- District: Timiskaming
- Incorporated: 1906

Government
  - Type: Township
  - Mayor: Dan Cleroux
  - Fed. riding: Nipissing—Timiskaming
  - Prov. riding: Timiskaming—Cochrane

Area
  - Land: 177.95 km^{2} (68.71 sq mi)

Population (2021)
  - Total: 517
  - Density: 2.9/km^{2} (7.5/sq mi)
- Time zone: UTC-5 (EST)
  - Summer (DST): UTC-4 (EDT)
- Postal Code: P0J 1C0
- Area codes: 705, 249
- Website: www.colemantownship.ca

Coleman is a township municipality in the Canadian province of Ontario. It is situated in the Timiskaming District of Northeastern Ontario. The township had a population of 517 in the 2021 Canadian census.

It is located along Highway 11 and 11-B.

== History ==
The community was first formed around 1906. The township is named after geologist A. P. Coleman, who did extensive work in the region in the late 1800s. Coleman also mapped the Sudbury Basin, leading to important nickel discoveries, and proved conclusively that the area had been repeatedly glaciated. The township celebrated its first 100 years in 2006.

On January 1, 1998, the Township of Coleman was enlarged when it annexed the unorganized northern part of Gillies Limit Township.

== Communities ==
- Gillies

== Demographics ==
In the 2021 Census of Population conducted by Statistics Canada, Coleman had a population of 517 living in 236 of its 295 total private dwellings, a change of −13.1% from its 2016 population of 595. With a land area of 177.95 km^{2} (68.71 sq mi), it had a population density of 2.9/km^{2} (7.5/sq mi) in 2021.

Canada census – Coleman community profile

	2021	2016	2011
Population	517 (-13.1% from 2016)	595 (-0.3% from 2011)	597 (+10.6% from 2006)
Land area	177.95 km^{2} (68.71 sq mi)	178.89 km^{2} (69.07 sq mi)	178.82 km^{2} (69.04 sq mi)
Population density	2.9/km^{2} (7.5/sq mi)	3.3/km^{2} (8.5/sq mi)	3.3/km^{2} (8.5/sq mi)
Median age	56.0 (M: 56.0, F: 56.0)	52.5 (M: 52.3, F: 52.8)	47.6 (M: , F: )
Private dwellings	295 (total) 236 (occupied)	338 (total)	325 (total)
Median household income	$74,000	$67,840

References: 2021 2016 2011

Historical census populations – Coleman, Ontario

Year	Pop.	±%
1911	3,131	—
1921	1,720	−45.1%
1931	1,087	−36.8%
1941	708	−34.9%
1951	713	+0.7%
1956	878	+23.1%
1961	712	−18.9%

Year	Pop.	±%
1966	741	+4.1%
1971	764	+3.1%
1976	685	−10.3%
1981	588	−14.2%
1986	441	−25.0%
1991	470	+6.6%
1996	499	+6.2%

Year	Pop.	±%
2001	550	+10.2%
2006	580	+5.5%
2011	597	+2.9%
2016	595	−0.3%
2021	517	−13.1%

2006 Population figure based on revised count. Population counts are not adjusted for boundary changes.
Source: Statistics Canada

Mother tongue (2021):

- English as first language: 72.1%
- French as first language: 25.0%
- English and French as first languages: 1.0%
- Other as first language: 1.9%

== See also ==
- List of townships in Ontario
- List of francophone communities in Ontario
