= List of secondary highways in Manitoulin District =

List of Ontario secondary highways

This is a list of secondary highways in Manitoulin District, which serve the isolated and sparsely populated areas in the Manitoulin District of Ontario.

== Highway 540 ==
Highway 540

Route information
- Maintained by Ministry of Transportation of Ontario
- Length: 131.3 km (81.6 mi)
- Existed: May 9, 1956–present

Major junctions
- West end: Front Street in Meldrum Bay
- Highway 540A; Highway 542; Highway 540B; Highway 551
- East end: Highway 6 at Little Current

Location
- Country: Canada
- Province: Ontario
- Districts: Manitoulin District
- Towns: Kagawong, Evansville

Highway system
- Ontario provincial highways; Current; Former; 400-series
← Highway 539A	→ Highway 540A

Secondary Highway 540, commonly referred to as Highway 540, is the primary east–west secondary highway on Manitoulin Island in the Canadian province of Ontario. At 132 km (82 mi), it is the longest highway on the island. It travels from the hamlet of Meldrum Bay, near the western end of the island, to Highway 6 in the community of Little Current. Two suffixed routes branch off from Highway 540: Highway 540A extends 5.8 km (3.6 mi) from the highway onto Barrie Island; and Highway 540B, a short business spur, travels north 1.4 km (0.87 mi) to Gore Bay.

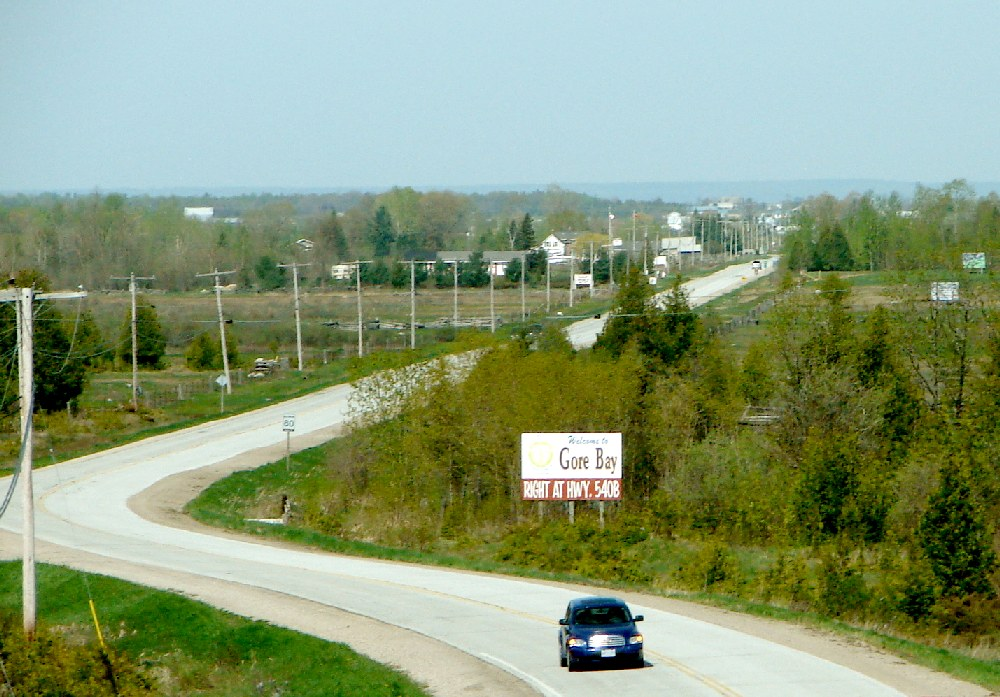
Highway 540 near Gordon.

== Highway 540A ==
Highway 540A

Route information
- Maintained by Ministry of Transportation of Ontario
- Length: 5.7 km (3.5 mi)
- Existed: May 9, 1956–present

Major junctions
- West end: Barrie Island 5th Sideroad near Gore Bay-Manitoulin Airport
- East end: Highway 540

Location
- Country: Canada
- Province: Ontario
- Districts: Manitoulin District
- Towns: Gordon/Barrie Island

Highway system
- Ontario provincial highways; Current; Former; 400-series
← Highway 540	→ Highway 540B

Secondary Highway 540A, commonly referred to as Highway 540A, is a secondary highway in the Canadian province of Ontario, linking Manitoulin Island with Barrie Island. It is the only road link between the two islands and has a total length of approximately 5.7 kilometres (3.5 mi).

Its western terminus is 5th Sideroad and South Line Road on Barrie Island, and its eastern terminus is at Highway 540. At the midpoint of the route, there is a junction with Airport Road, which leads to Gore Bay-Manitoulin Airport.

== Highway 540B ==
Highway 540B

Route information
- Maintained by Ministry of Transportation of Ontario
- Length: 2.4 km (1.5 mi)
- Existed: May 9, 1956–present

Major junctions
- From: Highway 540 – Little Current, Silver Water / Poplar Road
- To: Highway 540 – Little Current, Meldrum Bay / Highway 542 – Spring Bay

Location
- Country: Canada
- Province: Ontario
- Districts: Manitoulin District
- Towns: Gore Bay

Highway system
- Ontario provincial highways; Current; Former; 400-series
← Highway 540A	→ Highway 542

Secondary Highway 540B, commonly referred to as Highway 540B, is a short secondary highway on Manitoulin Island in Northern Ontario, which serves as a business spur linking the town of Gore Bay with Highway 540.

Although many commercial map providers provide conflicting information regarding the route, the highway begins at an intersection with Highway 540 and Poplar Road. From this intersection it travels north along Range Street, and enters Gore Bay. Within the town, the highway curves east, becoming Main Street. It travels into the town, then turns south onto Meredith Street. The highway turns east onto Agnes Street and gradually curves southeast. In front of the United Hall Church, the road curves south and becomes Gore Street. After a kilometre, Gore Street curves east and becomes Wright Street. This short street ends at the boundary of Gore Bay, at which point drivers must turn south to remain on the highway, which ends at a four-way intersection with Highway 540 and Highway 542. The section within the town limits of Gore Bay is maintained under a Connecting Link agreement.

== Highway 542 ==
Highway 542

Route information
- Maintained by Ministry of Transportation of Ontario
- Length: 69.6 km (43.2 mi)
- Existed: May 9, 1956–present

Major junctions
- West end: Highway 540 / Highway 540B – Gore Bay, Meldrum Bay
- Highway 551; Highway 542A
- East end: Highway 6 near Tehkummah

Location
- Country: Canada
- Province: Ontario
- Districts: Manitoulin District
- Towns: Mindemoya, Tehkummah

Highway system
- Ontario provincial highways; Current; Former; 400-series
← Highway 540B	→ Highway 542A

Secondary Highway 542, commonly referred to as Highway 542, is a secondary highway on Manitoulin Island in the Canadian province of Ontario. It links the township of Gore Bay to Tehkummah and Highway 6. Its total length is approximately 69.6 kilometres (43.2 mi). Its western terminus is Highway 540, and before its eastern terminus is at Highway 6, near Tehkummah, it passes through the small villages of Advance, Long Bay, Britainville, Spring Bay, Dryden's Corner, Monument Corner, Central Manitoulin, Mindemoya, Gibraltar, and Sandfield.

Between Dryden's Corner and Mindemoya, Highway 542 is concurrent with Highway 551 for approximately 10.3 kilometres (6.4 mi).

== Highway 542A ==
Highway 542A

Route information
- Maintained by Ministry of Transportation of Ontario
- Length: 2.4 km (1.5 mi)
- Existed: May 9, 1956–present

Major junctions
- From: 10th Sideroad, 2nd Concession Road at Tehkummah
- To: Highway 542 – Mindemoya, Gore Bay

Location
- Country: Canada
- Province: Ontario
- Districts: Manitoulin District
- Major cities: Tehkummah

Highway system
- Ontario provincial highways; Current; Former; 400-series
← Highway 542	→ Highway 546

Secondary Highway 542A, commonly referred to as Highway 542A, is a secondary highway on Manitoulin Island in the Canadian province of Ontario. It links the township of Tehkummah to Highway 542. Its total length is approximately 2.4 kilometres (1.5 mi). Its western terminus is 10th Sideroad and Concession Road 2 in Tehkummah, and its eastern terminus is at Highway 542.

== Highway 551 ==
Highway 551

Route information
- Maintained by Ministry of Transportation of Ontario
- Length: 28.5 km (17.7 mi)
- Existed: May 9, 1956–present

Major junctions
- Southwest end: Government Road near Providence Bay
- Highway 542 – 10.3 km (6.4 mi) concurrency Mindemoya to Dryden's Corner)
- Northeast end: Highway 540 at M'Chigeeng First Nation

Location
- Country: Canada
- Province: Ontario
- Districts: Manitoulin District
- Major cities: Central Manitoulin

Highway system
- Ontario provincial highways; Current; Former; 400-series
← Highway 550B	→ Highway 552

Secondary Highway 551, commonly referred to as Highway 551, is a secondary highway in the Canadian province of Ontario. Located in Manitoulin District, the highway has a total length of 28.5 kilometres (17.7 mi).

The highway begins at a junction with Highway 540 at the M'Chigeeng First Nation, extending southerly for 11.8 kilometres (7.3 mi) to the community of Mindemoya. At Mindemoya, the highway turns westerly, sharing the routing of Highway 542 for 10.3 kilometres (6.4 mi) to the community of Dryden's Corner, where the highways split again. From Dryden's Corner, Highway 551 extends southerly a further 6.4 kilometres (4.0 mi) to its terminus at Government Road the shore of Lake Huron just outside the community of Providence Bay.
