= Manitoulin District =

- District

- Location of Manitoulin District within Ontario
- Coordinates: 45°46′N 82°12′W
- Country: Canada
- Province: Ontario
- Region: Northeastern Ontario
- Created: 1888

Government
  - MP: Jim Belanger
  - MPP: Bill Rosenberg

Area
  - Land: 3,073.54 km^{2} (1,186.70 sq mi)

Population (2021)
  - Total: 13,935
  - Density: 4.5/km^{2} (12/sq mi)
- Time zone: UTC-5 (Eastern (EST))
  - Summer (DST): UTC-4 (EDT)
- Postal code span: P0P
- Area code: 705
- Seat: Gore Bay

Manitoulin District is a district in Northeastern Ontario within the Canadian province of Ontario. It was created in 1888 from part of the Algoma District. The district seat is in Gore Bay.

It comprises Manitoulin Island primarily, as well as a number of smaller islands surrounding it, such as Barrie, Cockburn, and Great La Cloche islands. Previously it included the municipality of Killarney on the mainland, until this was transferred to Sudbury District in the late 1990s. Subsequently, more mainland portions were added to Killarney and these, together with Unorganized Mainland Manitoulin District, were also transferred to Sudbury District in 2006, about 1,600 square kilometres (600 sq mi) in all.

== Geography ==
The district has an area of 3,073.54 square kilometres (1,186.70 sq mi), making it the smallest district in Ontario. It is in the northern part of Lake Huron, separated from the mainland by the North Channel to the north and by the Georgian Bay to the east.

Islands included within the district are:

- Barrie Island
- Bedford Island
- Burnt Islands (Big and Northwest)
- Clapperton Island
- Club Island
- Cockburn Island
- Duck Islands (Great, Middle, Outer, and Western)
- East Rous Island
- Fitzwilliam Island
- Goat Island
- Great La Cloche Island
- Greene Island
- Henry Island
- Heywood Island
- Manitoulin Island
- Rabbit Island
- Strawberry Island
- Thibault Island
- Vidal Island
- Wall Island
- Yeo Island

== Subdivisions ==
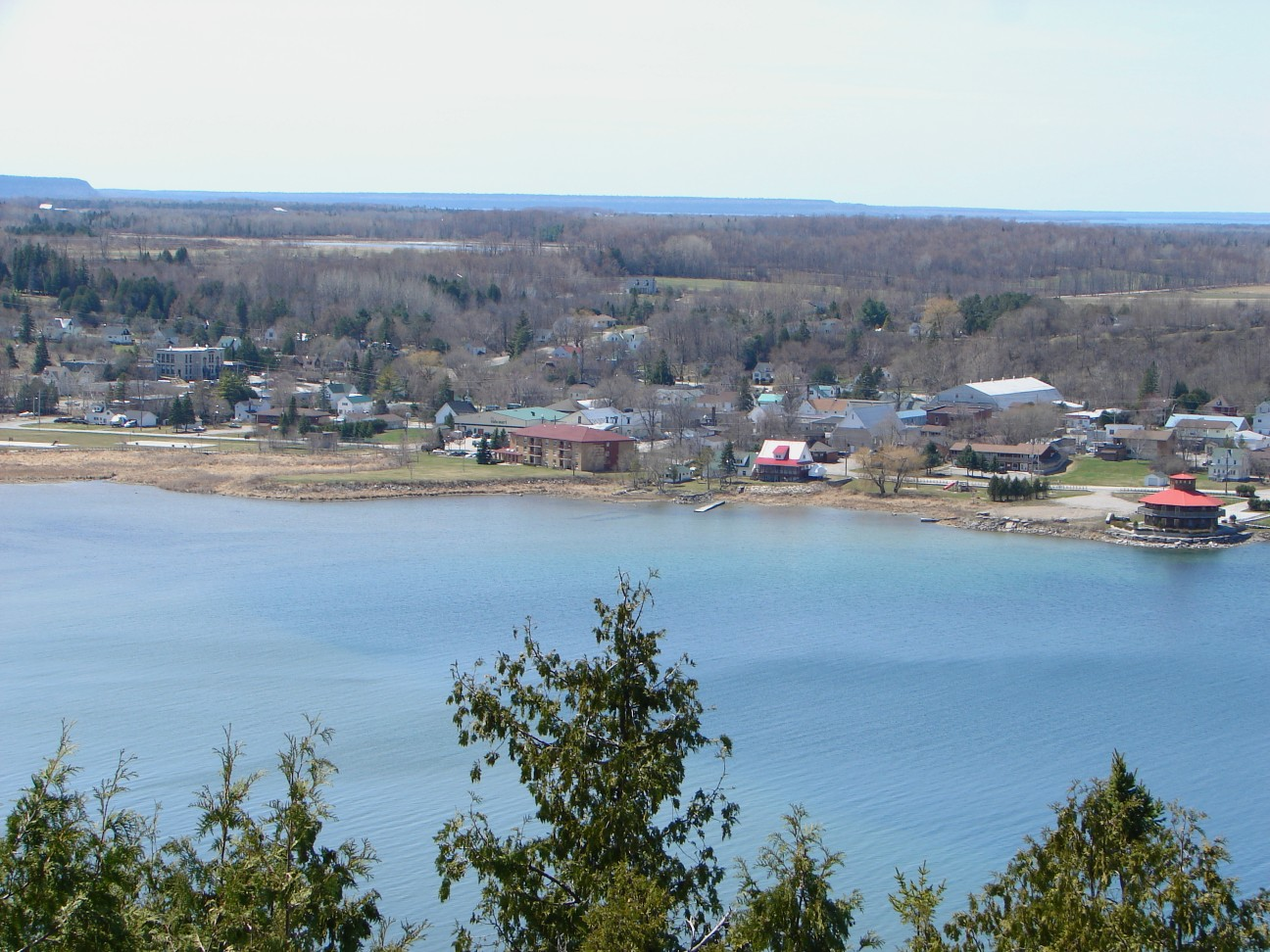
Gore Bay

Towns:

- Gore Bay
- Northeastern Manitoulin and the Islands

Townships:

- Assiginack
- Billings
- Burpee and Mills
- Central Manitoulin
- Cockburn Island
- Gordon/Barrie Island
- Tehkummah

Unorganized areas:

- Manitoulin, Unorganized, Mainland (dissolved in 2006)
- Manitoulin, Unorganized, West Part, includes these two geographic townships (each served by its own, separate local services board):
  - Dawson
  - Robinson

=== First Nations ===
Reserves:

- M'Chigeeng (West Bay)
- Sheguiandah
- Sheshegwaning
- Aundeck Omni Kaning
- Whitefish River
- Wikwemikong
- Zhiibaahaasing (Cockburn Island)

=== Communities ===
- Advance
- Bass Creek
- Bidwell
- Big Lake
- Bowser's Corner
- Britainville
- Burnt Island
- Burpee
- Clover Valley
- Cold Springs
- Cook's Dock
- Dinner Point Depot
- Dryden's Corner
- Eads Bush
- Eagles Nest
- Elizabeth Bay
- Evansville
- Fernlee
- Foxey
- Gibraltar
- Green Bay
- Grimsthorpe
- Hilly Grove
- Honora
- Ice Lake
- Kagawong
- Little Current
- Long Bay
- Manitowaning
- Meldrum Bay
- Michael's Bay
- Mindemoya
- Monument Corner
- Old Spring Bay
- Perivale
- Pleasant Valley
- Poplar
- Providence Bay
- Rockville
- Sandfield
- Sheguiandah
- Silver Water
- The Slash
- Snowville
- South Baymouth
- Spring Bay
- Squirrel Town
- Tobacco Lake
- Tolsmaville
- Turner
- Vanzant's Point

== Demographics ==
As a census division in the 2021 Census of Population conducted by Statistics Canada, the Manitoulin District had a population of 13,935 living in 6,144 of its 9,302 total private dwellings, a change of 5.1% from its 2016 population of 13,255. With a land area of 3,073.54 km^{2} (1,186.70 sq mi), it had a population density of 4.5/km^{2} (11.7/sq mi) in 2021.

Canada census – Manitoulin District community profile

	2021	2016	2011
Population	13,935 (+5.1% from 2016)	13,255 (+1.6% from 2011)	13,048 (3.3% from 2006)
Land area	3,073.54 km^{2} (1,186.70 sq mi)	3,107.23 km^{2} (1,199.71 sq mi)	3,107.11 km^{2} (1,199.66 sq mi)
Population density	4.5/km^{2} (12/sq mi)	4.3/km^{2} (11/sq mi)	4.2/km^{2} (11/sq mi)
Median age	51.6 (M: 50.8, F: 52.0)	49.5 (M: 49.0, F: 49.9)	46.6 (M: 46.2, F: 47.1)
Private dwellings	9,302 (total) 6,144 (occupied)	9,537 (total) 5,748 (occupied)	9281 (total)
Median household income	$63,600	$50,227

Notes: 2006 population adjusted for 2011 boundaries is 12,632.
References: 2021 2016 2011

Historical census populations – Manitoulin District

Year	Pop.	±%
1921	10,468	—
1931	10,734	+2.5%
1941	10,841	+1.0%
1951	11,214	+3.4%
1956	11,060	−1.4%
1961	11,176	+1.0%

Year	Pop.	±%
1966	10,544	−5.7%
1971	10,931	+3.7%
1976	10,893	−0.3%
1981	11,001	+1.0%
1986	9,823	−10.7%
1991	11,192	+13.9%

Year	Pop.	±%
1996	11,413	+2.0%
2001	12,679	+11.1%
2006	13,090	+3.2%
2011	13,048	−0.3%
2016	13,255	+1.6%
2021	13,935	+5.1%

Population counts are not adjusted for boundary changes.
Source: Statistics Canada

== Services ==
Like the other districts of Northern Ontario, the Manitoulin District does not have a county or regional municipality tier of government. All services in the district are provided either by the individual municipalities or directly by the provincial government. Services are provided jointly with the Sudbury District from its district seat in Espanola.

== Transportation ==
King's Highways:

- #6

Secondary Highways:

- #540
- #540A
- #540B
- #542
- #542A
- #551

== Media ==
The district is served by two weekly community newspapers, the Manitoulin Expositor in Little Current and the Manitoulin West Recorder in Gore Bay; the papers are sister publications both owned and operated by the McCutcheon family.

The district is served by the commercial radio stations CFRM-FM and CHAW-FM, the First Nations community radio station CHYF-FM, and the Elliot Lake-based commercial radio station CKNR-FM. It is otherwise primarily served by media from Sudbury, including the Sudbury Star and CTV Northern Ontario.

== See also ==
- List of townships in Ontario
- Manitoulin Streams Improvement Association - A not-for-profit group that rehabilitates streams, rivers, and creeks on Manitoulin Island.
- List of secondary schools in Ontario § Manitoulin District
