= Unorganized Mainland Manitoulin District =

Unorganized Mainland Manitoulin
- Former unorganized territory
- Manitoulin, Unorganized, Mainland
- Location within Southern Ontario
- Coordinates: 46°00′N 81°06′W
- Country: Canada
- Province: Ontario
- District: Manitoulin

Government
  - Federal riding: Nickel Belt
  - Prov. riding: Nickel Belt

Area
  - Land: 140.45 km^{2} (54.23 sq mi)

Population (2006)
  - Total: 5
  - Density: 0.04/km^{2} (0.10/sq mi)
- Time zone: UTC-5 (EST)
  - Summer (DST): UTC-4 (EDT)

Unorganized Mainland Manitoulin was an unorganized area in the Canadian province of Ontario, encompassing the small mainland portion of the Manitoulin District which was not part of the municipality of Killarney. It was dissolved and annexed into Killarney in 2006.

It comprised the geographic townships of Carlyle and Humboldt, as well as the unpopulated Indian reserve of Point Grondine. The only named settlement within the division is the ghost town of Collins Inlet. Prior to the incorporation of Killarney in 1999, the unorganized territory had an area of 772.86 square kilometres (298.40 sq mi).

The division had a population of five in the Canada 2006 Census, and a land area of 140.45 square kilometres (54.23 sq mi). There were a total of nine private dwellings, mostly for seasonal use and one of which was occupied. It had no population in the 2001 census, while there were two persons living in the area in 1996.

Historical census populations – Manitoulin, Unorganized, Mainland
Year	Pop.	±%
1976	13	—
1981	16	+23.1%
1986	35	+118.8%
1991	43	+22.9%
1996	2	−95.3%
2001	0	−100.0%
2006	5	—
Population counts are not adjusted for boundary changes. Source: Statistics Canada
