= Burpee and Mills =

- Township (single-tier)
- Township of Burpee and Mills
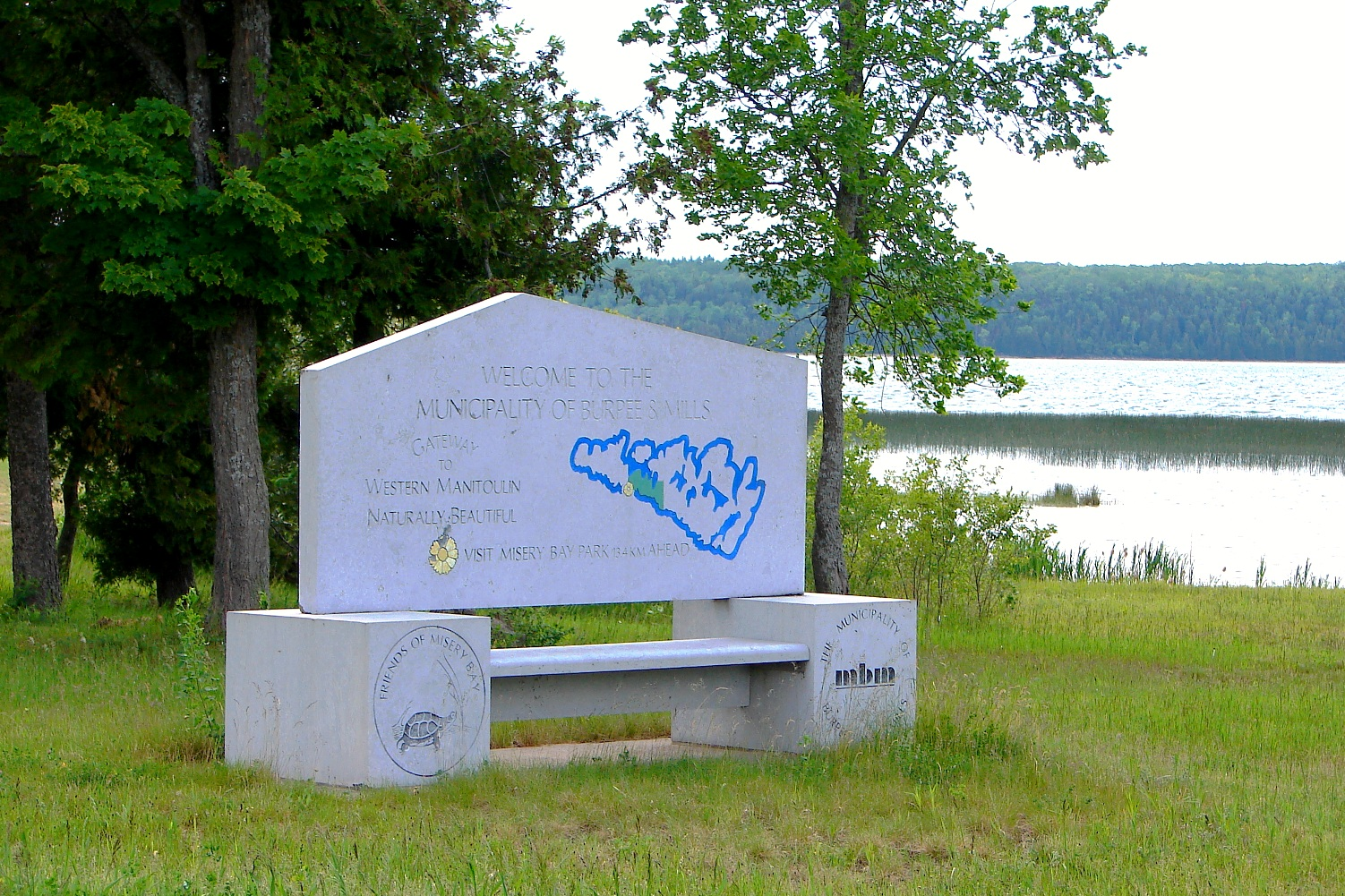

- Location within Manitoulin District Location within Ontario
- Coordinates: 45°47′N 82°34′W
- Country: Canada
- Province: Ontario
- District: Manitoulin
- Formed: January 1, 1998

Government
  - Type: Township
  - Reeve: Ken Noland
  - MP: Jim Belanger (Conservative)
  - MPP: Bill Rosenberg (PC)

Area
  - Land: 217.33 km^{2} (83.91 sq mi)

Population (2021)
  - Total: 382
  - Density: 1.8/km^{2} (4.7/sq mi)
- Time zone: UTC-5 (EST)
  - Summer (DST): UTC-4 (EDT)
- Postal code: P0P 1H0
- Area codes: 705, 249
- Website: www.burpeemills.com

Burpee and Mills is a township in the Canadian province of Ontario.

Located in the Manitoulin District, the township had a population of 382 in the 2021 Canadian census. Industries include tourism, agriculture, aquaculture, and logging. It was formed on January 1, 1998, through the annexation of the unorganized geographic township of Mills by Burpee Township.

It is named after Isaac Burpee and David Mills.

== Communities ==
The township comprises the communities of Burpee, Elizabeth Bay, Evansville and Poplar.

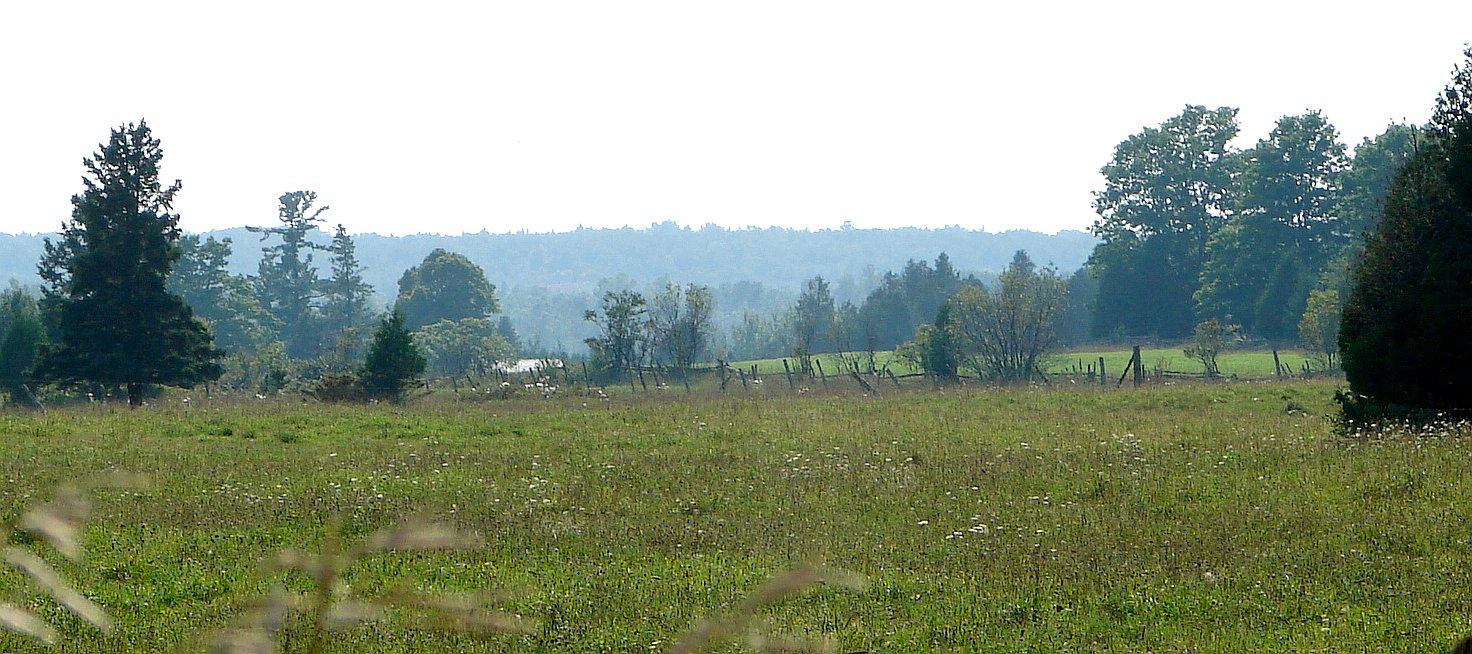
Rural country between Evansville and Elizabeth Bay

== Demographics ==
In the 2021 Census of Population conducted by Statistics Canada, Burpee and Mills had a population of 382 living in 167 of its 292 total private dwellings, a change of 11.4% from its 2016 population of 343. With a land area of 217.33 km^{2} (83.91 sq mi), it had a population density of 1.8/km^{2} (4.6/sq mi) in 2021.

Canada census – Burpee and Mills community profile

	2021	2016	2011
Population	382 (+11.4% from 2016)	343 (+11.4% from 2011)	308 (-6.4% from 2006)
Land area	217.33 km^{2} (83.91 sq mi)	218.48 km^{2} (84.36 sq mi)	218.48 km^{2} (84.36 sq mi)
Population density	1.8/km^{2} (4.7/sq mi)	1.6/km^{2} (4.1/sq mi)	1.4/km^{2} (3.6/sq mi)
Median age	58.0 (M: 58.0, F: 59.2)	54.8 (M: 53.6, F: 55.6)
Private dwellings	292 (total) 167 (occupied)	274 (total)	255 (total)
Median household income	$61,600	$56,192

References: 2021 2016 2011

Historical census populations – Burpee and Mills
Year	Pop.	±%
2001	362	—
2006	329	−9.1%
2011	308	−6.4%
2016	343	+11.4%
2021	382	+11.4%
Source: Statistics Canada

Historical census populations – Burpee Township (1881–1997)

Year	Pop.	±%
1881	125	—
1891	186	+48.8%
1901	285	+53.2%
1911	293	+2.8%
1921	310	+5.8%
1931	313	+1.0%

Year	Pop.	±%
1941	349	+11.5%
1951	327	−6.3%
1956	327	+0.0%
1961	301	−8.0%
1966	257	−14.6%
1971	209	−18.7%

Year	Pop.	±%
1976	202	−3.3%
1981	200	−1.0%
1986	216	+8.0%
1991	232	+7.4%
1996	228	−1.7%

Source: Statistics Canada

== See also ==
- List of townships in Ontario
