= CFRM-FM =

Radio station in Ontario, Canada

Coordinates: 45.98042°N 81.92662°W

- Little Current, Ontario; Canada
- Broadcast area: Northeastern Manitoulin and the Islands
- Frequency: 100.7 MHz (HD Radio)
- Branding: Hits 100

Programming
- Format: Adult hits

Ownership
- Owner: Manitoulin Radio Communication; (Craig Timmermans)
- Sister stations: CHAW-FM

History
- First air date: 2002
- Former frequencies: 101.1 MHz (2001–2007)
- Call sign meaning: Radio Manitoulin (owner)

Technical information
- Class: A
- ERP: 27,500 watts
- HAAT: 155 metres

Links
- Website: hits100.ca

CFRM-FM is a Canadian radio station that broadcasts at 100.7 FM in Little Current, Ontario, serving Northeastern Manitoulin and the Islands. The station, a community radio outlet owned by Manitoulin Radio Communication, broadcasts an adult hits format branded as Hits 100.

== History ==
The station originally began operating in 2001 on 101.1 FM, as Manitoulin's first local community radio station with a rock format including a mix of various formats such as oldies, classic hits, retro music with some current music branded as Rock'n the Rock. One of CFRM's mottos were "rock'n the rock" and "when the lights go out we stay on the air because we're powered by rock and roll". CFRM received approval from the CRTC to increase its power from 1.4 watts to 5 watts on July 12, 2002 and received approval again on September 20, 2005, to increase power from 5 watts to 45 watts.

On October 23, 2006, CFRM changes formats to its current country music format. On March 19, 2007, CFRM moved to 100.7 with 1,830 watts. After the move in 2007, the station became 100.7 The Island.

In 2008, Manitoulin Radio Communication Inc. (Manitoulin Radio) applied to the Canadian Radio-television and Telecommunications Commission to add a low-power FM transmitter in Sudbury to rebroadcast the programming of CFRM-FM Little Current. The new transmitter in Sudbury would operate at 107.1 MHz (channel 296LP) with an effective radiated power (ERP) of 50 watts. Citing that this "would allow Sudbury residents who own property on Manitoulin Island to stay connected by providing them with important information relating to local weather, marine and road reports and events specific to Manitoulin." That application was denied by the CRTC on April 29, 2008.

On January 20, 2009, the station applied to change its authorized transmission contours by increasing the average effective radiated power from 1,830 watts to 27,500 watts, by decreasing the effective antenna height above average terrain from 164.5 metres to 155 metres. This would change the station's transmitter class from A to B. This application to change the ERP received approval on March 19, 2009.

In 2010, 100.7 The Island FM won Radio Station of the Year in a Secondary Market at the Canadian Country Music Association Awards.

=== Expanding horizons ===
In 2014, Craig Timmermans filed an application with the CRTC to add a second sister station at 103.1 FM. If the new station is approved as requested, it will take over CFRM's current country format, while CFRM will reformat as a pop and dance station. The new station was approved on April 1, 2015, as CHAW-FM, with 100.7 becoming Glow 100.

On April 1, 2016, at 12:00 PM, the country station moved to CHAW-FM and CFRM become Glow 100 with a top 40/dance format. The first song to be played on "Glow" was "Cake by the Ocean" by DNCE.

In June 2019, the station was rebranded as Hits 100. The station later switched to an adult hits variety format playing a mix of rock, pop, top 40, hot ac, soft ac, dance, R&B and more with its slogan 80s, 90s and Everything, which also plays some current top 40 hits.

Station owners Craig and Kelly "KT" Timmermans are also producers of the Manitoulin Country Fest, a local country music festival staged each August.

In 2020, it was announced that both CFRM-FM and CHAW-FM would move into their new studios at 1 Radio Rd, Off of Habour View Rd, PO Box 871 Little Current, Ontario P0P 1K0.

== Going green ==
CFRM has implemented a plan to become an environmentally friendly radio station. The project to go "green" consists of three phases:

- Phase I - Installing a wind turbine with grid tie at the tower site to help power the transmitter plant. This project was completed mid June 2008.
- Phase II - Installing a vertical wind turbine at CFRM's studios in Little Current. This project will be completed by October 2008.
- Phase III - Installing multiple wind turbines at the tower site, effectively creating a small wind farm which would also put excess power onto the grid.

More recently, the station has pursued further environmental initiatives. As of 2014, the station's daytime studio operations are powered entirely by a diesel electric generator running on used fryer oil recycled from local restaurants. In early 2015, the station also added a bidirectional electricity meter, so that unused power from the generator can be contributed back into the electrical grid.

During its history as a low-power experimental station, CFRM served a testbed for technologies, such as Ibiquity's IBOC digital radio system, which are rarely used elsewhere in Canada.
