= Unorganized territory =

Unorganized territory may refer to:

- An unincorporated area in any number of countries
  - The U.S. state of Maine uses the word "unorganized territory" specifically to mean an area with no local municipal government. See List of unorganized territories in Maine
- One of the current or former territories of the United States that has not had a government "organized" with an "organic act" by the U.S. Congress
- Unorganized area, any geographic region in Canada that does not form part of a municipality or Indian reserve

== See also ==
- Unorganized Borough, Alaska, an area without county-level government.
- Unparished area, areas of England outside any civil parish
