= CHAW-FM =

Radio station in Little Current, Ontario

Coordinates: 45.98042°N 81.92662°W

- Little Current, Ontario; Canada
- Broadcast area: Northeastern Manitoulin and the Islands
- Frequency: 103.1 MHz
- Branding: Country 103

Programming
- Format: Country

Ownership
- Owner: Manitoulin Broadcasting Corporation; (Craig Timmermans)
- Sister stations: CFRM-FM

History
- First air date: April 1, 2016
- Call sign meaning: Haweater

Technical information
- Class: B
- ERP: 35,200 watts
- HAAT: 178 meters

Links
- Website: country103fm.ca

CHAW-FM is a Canadian FM radio station that broadcasts at 103.1 MHz in Little Current, Ontario, serving Algoma, Manitoulin and a good portion of the 17 and 69 Highways including Tobermory and areas of the northern Bruce Peninsula. The station, owned by Manitoulin Broadcasting Corporation through licensee Craig Timmermans, broadcasts a country format branded as Country 103. Timmermans received approval to broadcast from the CRTC on April 1, 2015. The station broadcasts with an effective radiated power of 35,200 watts (non-directional antenna with an effective height of antenna above average terrain of 178 metres).

== History ==
On April 1, 2016 at 12:00 PM noon, CFRM-FM, which aired country, changed formats to top 40/80s, 90s and everything, while CHAW launched the country station at the same time. The first song to be played on Country 103 was "Runaway Highway" by local artist Mike Trudell.

Both CHAW and CFRM broadcast from 1 Radio Road in Little Current. The stations are the first in Canada to be broadcasting 100% off grid from the office and supplemented by green energy from the tower site.
