= Interstate 540 =

Interstate 540 may mean:

- Interstate 540 (Arkansas), a spur from Interstate 40 to Fort Smith, Arkansas; formerly also to Bentonville, Arkansas (now part of Interstate 49)
- Interstate 540 (North Carolina), the free portion of a partially tolled loop road around Raleigh, North Carolina.
