= University of Toronto (disambiguation) =

The University of Toronto is a public research university located in the Greater Toronto Area of Ontario, Canada. It has three campuses:

- University of Toronto St. George, located in downtown Toronto, Ontario
- University of Toronto Mississauga, located in Mississauga, Ontario
- University of Toronto Scarborough, located in Scarborough, Toronto, Ontario

The University of Toronto may also refer to the following:

- University of Toronto Schools, a university-preparatory and laboratory school affiliated with the University of Toronto
- University of Toronto Press, an affiliated publishing house, sometimes referred to simply as University of Toronto in bibliographical citations

== See also ==
- Post-secondary education in Toronto
