= Gordon/Barrie Island =

- Municipality (single-tier)
- Municipality of Gordon/Barrie Island
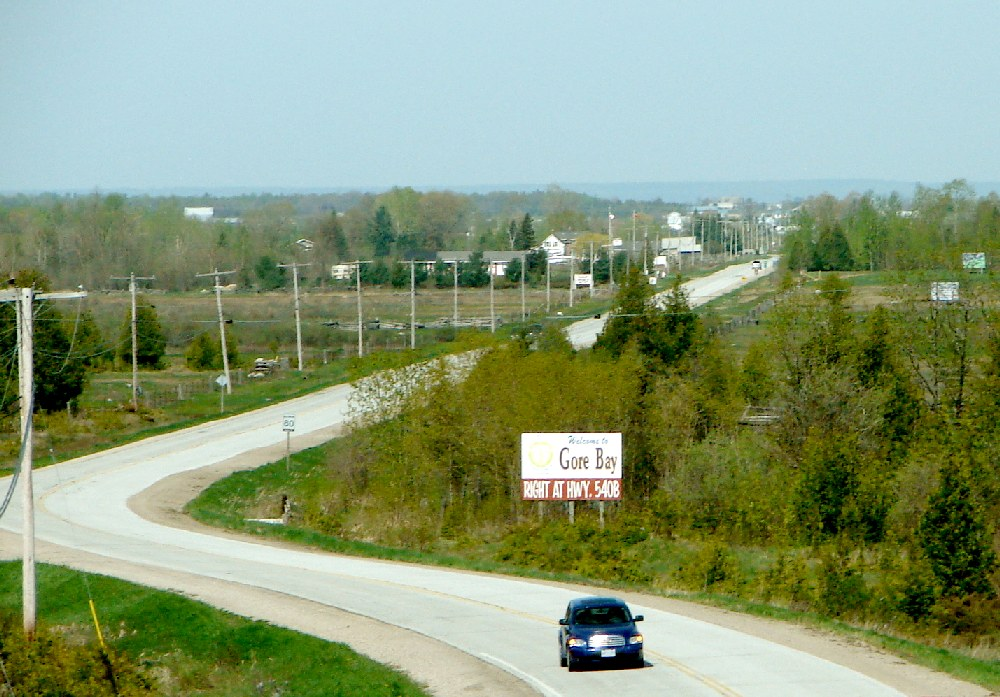
- Highway 540 through Gordon

- Location within Manitoulin District Location within Ontario
- Coordinates: 45°54′N 82°38′W
- Country: Canada
- Province: Ontario
- District: Manitoulin
- Formed: January 1, 2009

Government
  - Type: Township
  - Reeve: Lee Hayden
  - Federal riding: Sudbury East—Manitoulin—Nickel Belt
  - Prov. riding: Algoma—Manitoulin

Area
  - Land: 263.44 km^{2} (101.71 sq mi)

Population (2021)
  - Total: 613
  - Density: 2.3/km^{2} (6.0/sq mi)
- Time zone: UTC-5 (EST)
  - Summer (DST): UTC-4 (EDT)
- Postal Code: P0P
- Area code: 705
- Website: www.gordonbarrieisland.ca

The Municipality of Gordon/Barrie Island is a township in Manitoulin District in north central Ontario, Canada. It was formed on January 1, 2009, upon the amalgamation of the townships of Gordon (incorporated 1875) and Barrie Island.

The township consists of the communities of Advance, Foxey, Ice Lake, Tobacco Lake, and Barrie Island. Gordon/Barrie Island also contains three lakes: Nameless Lake, Tobacco Lake, and Ice Lake.

== Barrie Island ==
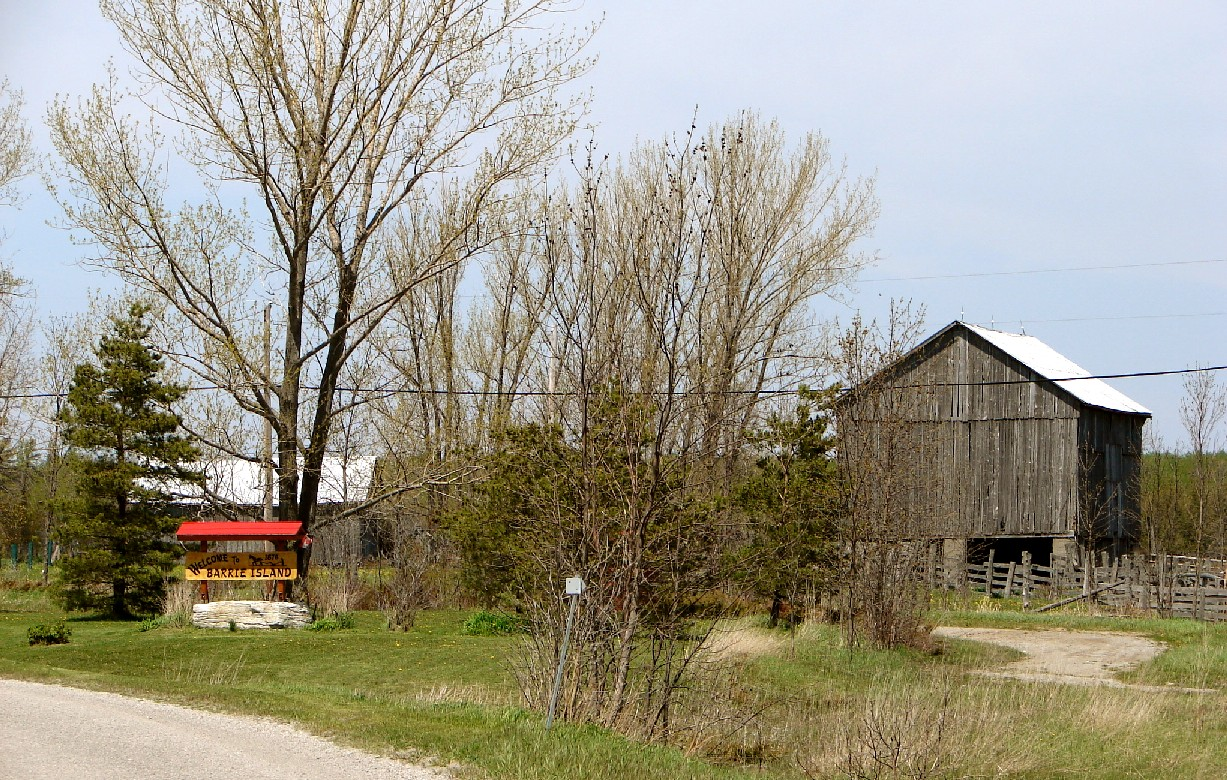
Barrie Island Welcome Sign

Barrie Island (45°55′N 82°40′W) is about 8 kilometres (5.0 mi) wide, 13 kilometres (8.1 mi) long, and had a surface area of 78.9 square kilometres (30.5 sq mi) in the 2006 census. It is connected to Manitoulin by Highway 540A, which crosses the water via a causeway at the narrowest part of the strait.

The island, named after Robert Barrie, has a significant summer recreational population.

John Gordon Lane was born on Barrie Island, the Member of Provincial Parliament for Algoma—Manitoulin from 1971 to 1987.

== Demographics ==
In the 2021 Census of Population conducted by Statistics Canada, Gordon/Barrie Island had a population of 613 living in 294 of its 621 total private dwellings, a change of 25.1% from its 2016 population of 490. With a land area of 263.44 km^{2} (101.71 sq mi), it had a population density of 2.3/km^{2} (6.0/sq mi) in 2021.

Canada census – Gordon/Barrie Island community profile

	2021	2016	2011
Population	613 (+25.1% from 2016)	490 (-6.8% from 2011)	526 (+14.6% from 2006)
Land area	263.44 km^{2} (101.71 sq mi)	267.77 km^{2} (103.39 sq mi)	268.14 km^{2} (103.53 sq mi)
Population density	2.3/km^{2} (6.0/sq mi)	1.8/km^{2} (4.7/sq mi)	2.0/km^{2} (5.2/sq mi)
Median age	61.6 (M: 62.8, F: 60.0)	51.4 (M: 52.4, F: 50.4)
Private dwellings	621 (total) 294 (occupied)	523 (total)	599 (total)
Median household income	$68,500	$56,960

References: 2021 2016 2011

Historical census populations – Gordon Township (1875–2008)

Year	Pop.	±%
1881	565	—
1891	455	−19.5%
1901	440	−3.3%
1911	429	−2.5%
1921	363	−15.4%
1931	387	+6.6%
1941	375	−3.1%

Year	Pop.	±%
1951	557	+48.5%
1956	507	−9.0%
1961	490	−3.4%
1966	462	−5.7%
1971	352	−23.8%
1976	336	−4.5%
1981	367	+9.2%

Year	Pop.	±%
1986	384	+4.6%
1991	435	+13.3%
1996	473	+8.7%
2001	473	+0.0%
2006	412	−12.9%

Population counts are not adjusted for boundary changes.
Source: Statistics Canada

Historical census populations – Barrie Island Township

Year	Pop.	±%
1881	143	—
1891	209	+46.2%
1901	268	+28.2%
1911	206	−23.1%
1921	196	−4.9%
1931	164	−16.3%
1941	164	+0.0%

Year	Pop.	±%
1951	159	−3.0%
1956	149	−6.3%
1961	146	−2.0%
1966	118	−19.2%
1971	109	−7.6%
1976	108	−0.9%
1981	92	−14.8%

Year	Pop.	±%
1986	84	−8.7%
1991	75	−10.7%
1996	60	−20.0%
2001	50	−16.7%
2006	47	−6.0%

Source: Statistics Canada

== See also ==
- List of townships in Ontario
