= Unorganized area =

Geographic region in Canada not part of a municipality or Indian reserve

An unorganized area or unorganized territory (French: Territoire non organisé) is any geographic region in Canada that does not form part of a municipality or Indian reserve. In these areas, the lowest level of government is provincial or territorial. In some of these areas, local service agencies may have some of the responsibilities that would otherwise be covered by municipalities.

== British Columbia ==
Most regional districts in British Columbia include some electoral areas, which are unincorporated areas that do not have their own municipal government, but residents of such areas still receive a form of local government by electing representatives to their regional district boards.

The Stikine Region in the province's far northwest is the only part of British Columbia not in a regional district, because of its low population and the lack of any incorporated municipalities. The Stikine Region—not to be confused with the Stikine Country or the Kitimat-Stikine Regional District—provides services and regulatory capacities in the same way as regional districts, however, but is managed directly by the provincial government instead of by a regional district board.

== Manitoba ==
In Manitoba, territories not part of rural municipalities, urban municipalities (city, town, or village), local government districts, or Indian reserves are classified as "Unorganized". These cover 67.4% of the total area of the province of Manitoba, with Unorganized Division No. 23 constituting more than half of the entire unorganized area of the province. The unorganized areas of Manitoba are labeled to and referred as with the Census division number they are located in, even though census divisions do not serve any administrative purpose.

== Nunavut ==
Nunavut has three unorganized areas: Kitikmeot, Unorganized, Qikiqtaaluk, Unorganized and Kivalliq, Unorganized.

== Ontario ==
In Ontario, unorganized areas are found only in the Northern Ontario region, inclusive of the Parry Sound District, the parts of the province where there is no county or regional municipality level of government. Some communities within unorganized areas may have some municipal services administered by local services boards.

Unorganized areas in Ontario are named only by the district of which they are a part, with a geographic qualifier added when a single district contains more than one such area. Three of the province's unorganized areas had no reported population in the Canada 2006 Census; they are marked with †daggers.

- Algoma, UNO, North Part
- †Algoma, UNO, South East Part
- Cochrane, UNO, North Part
- Cochrane, UNO, South East Part
- †Cochrane, UNO, South West Part
- Kenora, UNO
- Manitoulin, UNO, Mainland
- Manitoulin, UNO, West Part
- Nipissing, UNO, North Part
- Nipissing, UNO, South Part
- Parry Sound, UNO, Centre Part
- Parry Sound, UNO, North East Part
- Rainy River, UNO
- Sudbury, UNO, North Part
- Thunder Bay, UNO
- †Timiskaming, UNO, East Part
- Timiskaming, UNO, West Part

== Quebec ==
Unorganized territories (territoires non organisés) in Quebec are located within regional county municipalities. They are usually named for a geographic feature within the unincorporated area.

== Saskatchewan ==
The Northern Saskatchewan Administration District is the unorganized area of Saskatchewan, which encompasses approximately half of the province’s landmass. Because of its extremely sparse population, the district has no local government and is directly subject to the Minister of Government Relations.

== Yukon ==
Unorganized Yukon is the unorganized area covering the majority of Yukon.

== See also ==
- Unincorporated area
- Unorganized territory
