= Central Manitoulin =

- Township (single-tier)
- Municipality of Central Manitoulin
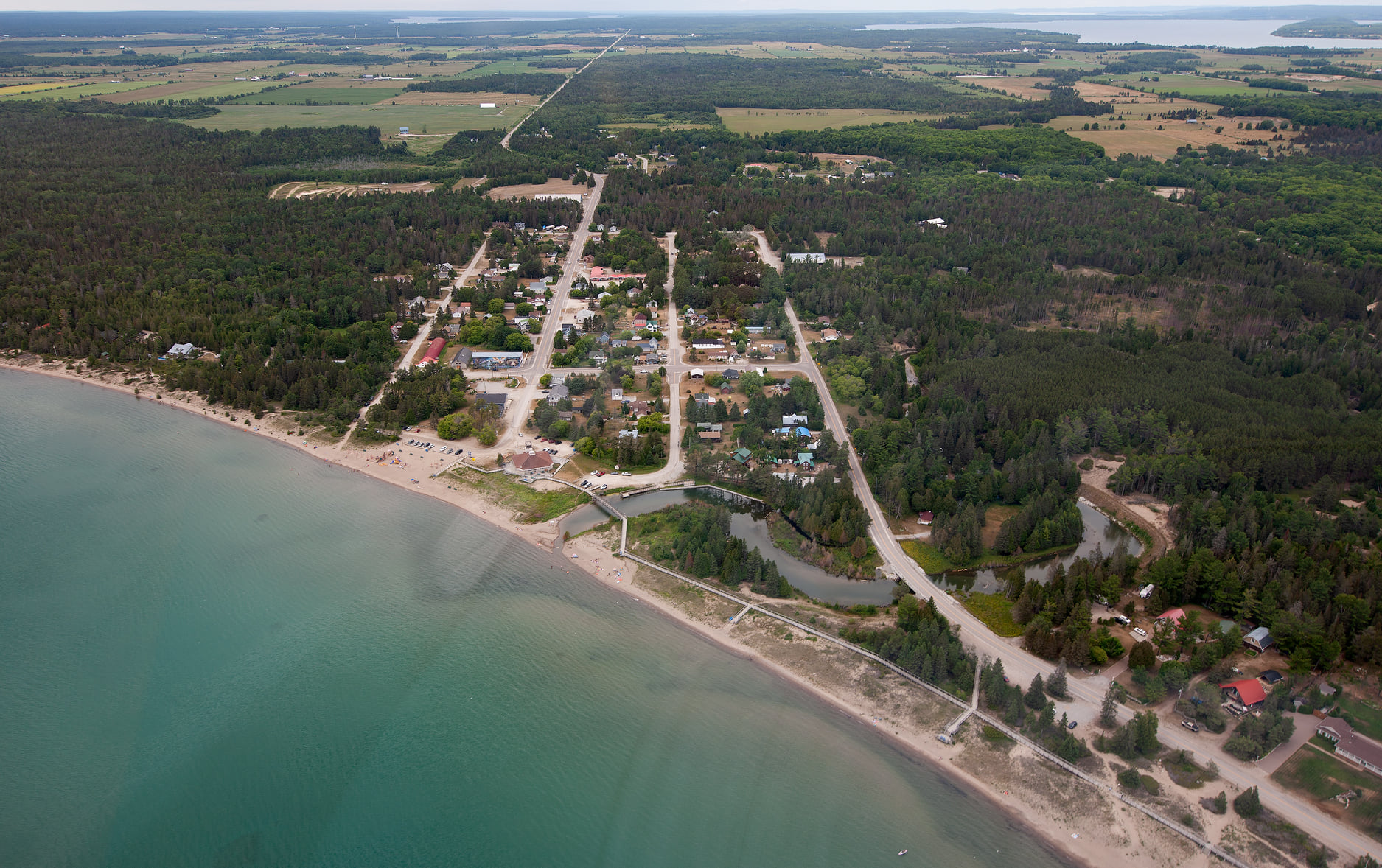
- Aerial view of Central Manitoulin with Providence Bay Beach in the foreground.

- Location within Manitoulin District Location within Ontario
- Coordinates: 45°43′N 82°12′W
- Country: Canada
- Province: Ontario
- District: Manitoulin
- Incorporated: May 1, 1998

Government
  - Reeve: Richard Stephens
  - Federal riding: Sudbury East—Manitoulin—Nickel Belt
  - Prov. riding: Algoma—Manitoulin

Area
  - Land: 427.61 km^{2} (165.10 sq mi)

Population (2021)
  - Total: 2,235
  - Density: 5.2/km^{2} (13/sq mi)
- Time zone: UTC-5 (EST)
  - Summer (DST): UTC-4 (EDT)
- Postal Code FSA: P0P
- Area code: 705
- Website: www.centralmanitoulin.ca

Central Manitoulin is a township in the Canadian province of Ontario. It is located on Manitoulin Island and in Manitoulin District.

The Township of Central Manitoulin was formed on May 1, 1998, through the annexation of the unorganized geographic township of Sandfield by Carnarvon Township. Carnarvon Township was incorporated in 1871, and named after Henry Herbert, 4th Earl of Carnarvon.

== Geography ==
Treasure Island, the largest island in a lake on an island in a lake, is located in Central Manitoulin, in Lake Mindemoya. The largest lake in a lake, Lake Manitou, is also mainly located in Central Manitoulin.

=== Communities ===
The primary community and administrative centre of the township is Mindemoya. Smaller communities include Big Lake, Britainville, Dryden's Corner, Gibraltar, Grimsthorpe, Long Bay, Monument Corner, Old Spring Bay, Perivale, Providence Bay, Sandfield, and Spring Bay.

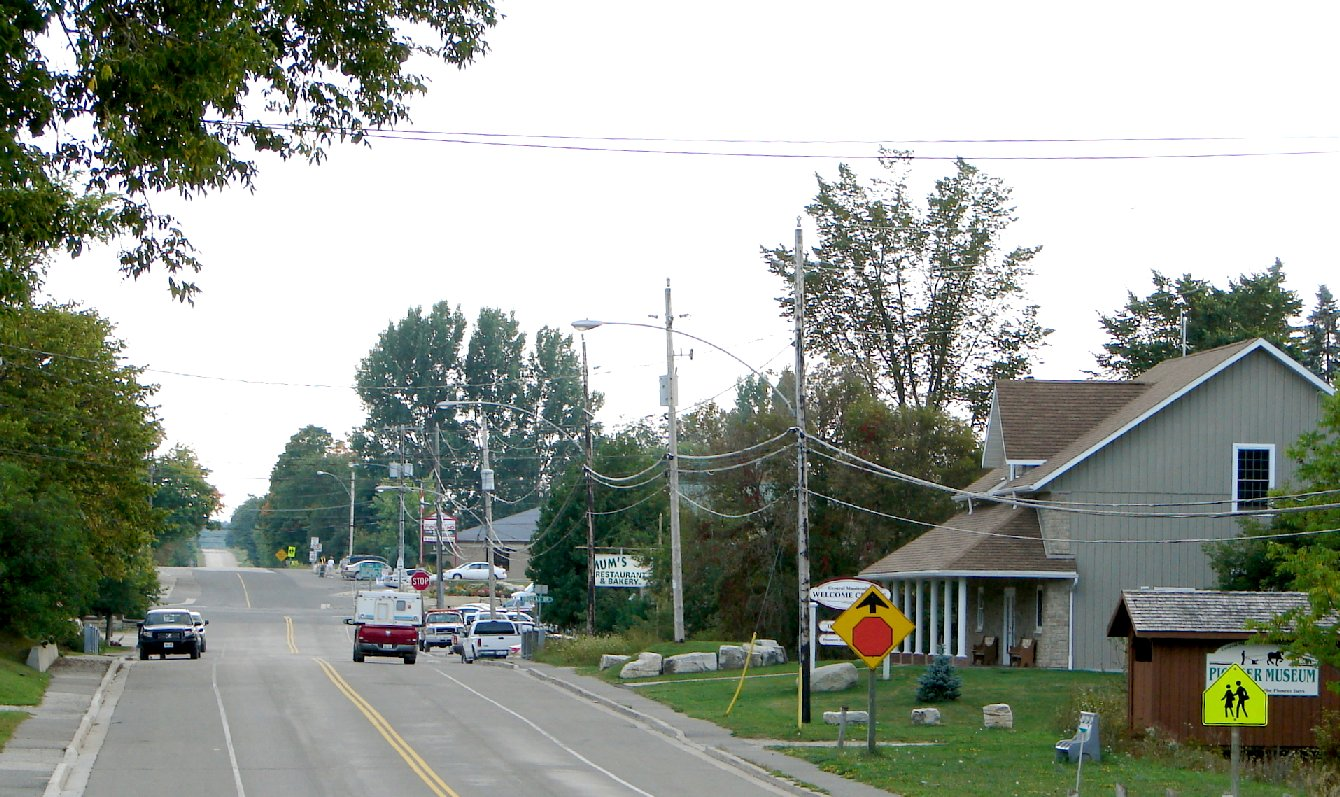
Mindemoya

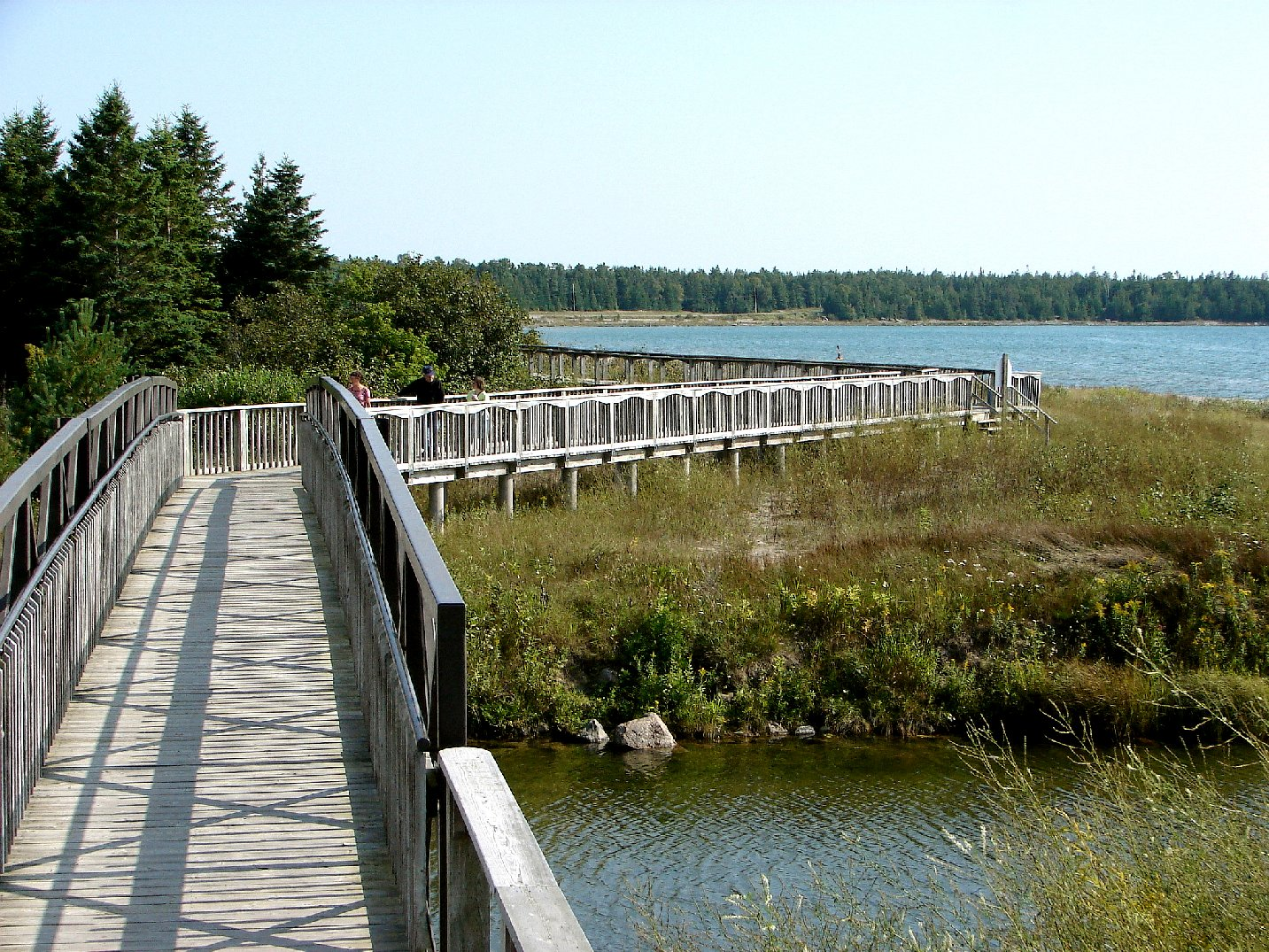
Providence Bay

== Demographics ==
In the 2021 Census of Population conducted by Statistics Canada, Central Manitoulin had a population of 2,235 living in 1,050 of its 1,603 total private dwellings, a change of 7.2% from its 2016 population of 2,084. With a land area of 427.61 km^{2} (165.10 sq mi), it had a population density of 5.2/km^{2} (13.5/sq mi) in 2021.

Canada census – Central Manitoulin community profile

	2021	2016	2011
Population	2,235 (+7.2% from 2016)	2,084 (+6.4% from 2011)	1,958 (+0.7% from 2006)
Land area	427.61 km^{2} (165.10 sq mi)	431.11 km^{2} (166.45 sq mi)	431.53 km^{2} (166.61 sq mi)
Population density	5.2/km^{2} (13/sq mi)	4.8/km^{2} (12/sq mi)	4.5/km^{2} (12/sq mi)
Median age	58.4 (M: 58.4, F: 58.8)	56.7 (M: 56.9, F: 56.5)
Private dwellings	1,603 (total) 1,050 (occupied)	1,629 (total)	1,541 (total)
Median household income	$70,000	$59,328

References: 2021 2016 2011

Historical census populations – Central Manitoulin
Year	Pop.	±%
2001	1,907	—
2006	1,944	+1.9%
2011	1,958	+0.7%
2016	2,084	+6.4%
2021	2,235	+7.2%
Source: Statistics Canada

Mother tongue (2021):

- English as first language: 91.2 %
- French as first language: 4.3 %
- English and French as first language: 0.2 %
- Other as first language: 3.6 %

== Smallest jail ==
Ontario has had a few historical claimants, by towns, for housing the province's smallest jail, the main three being: Tweed, Creemore and Coboconk. However, old jailhouses in Providence Bay, Port Dalhousie, Rodney, and ghost town Berens River have proven to be even smaller. The jailhouse in Providence Bay is now a cabin for tourists to stay at. It is at 56 Munro Street, Providence Bay, ON. 45 40' 14.72'' N x 82 16' 13.47'' W

== See also ==
- List of townships in Ontario
