= Gore Bay, Ontario =

Gore Bay
- Town (single-tier)
- Town of Gore Bay
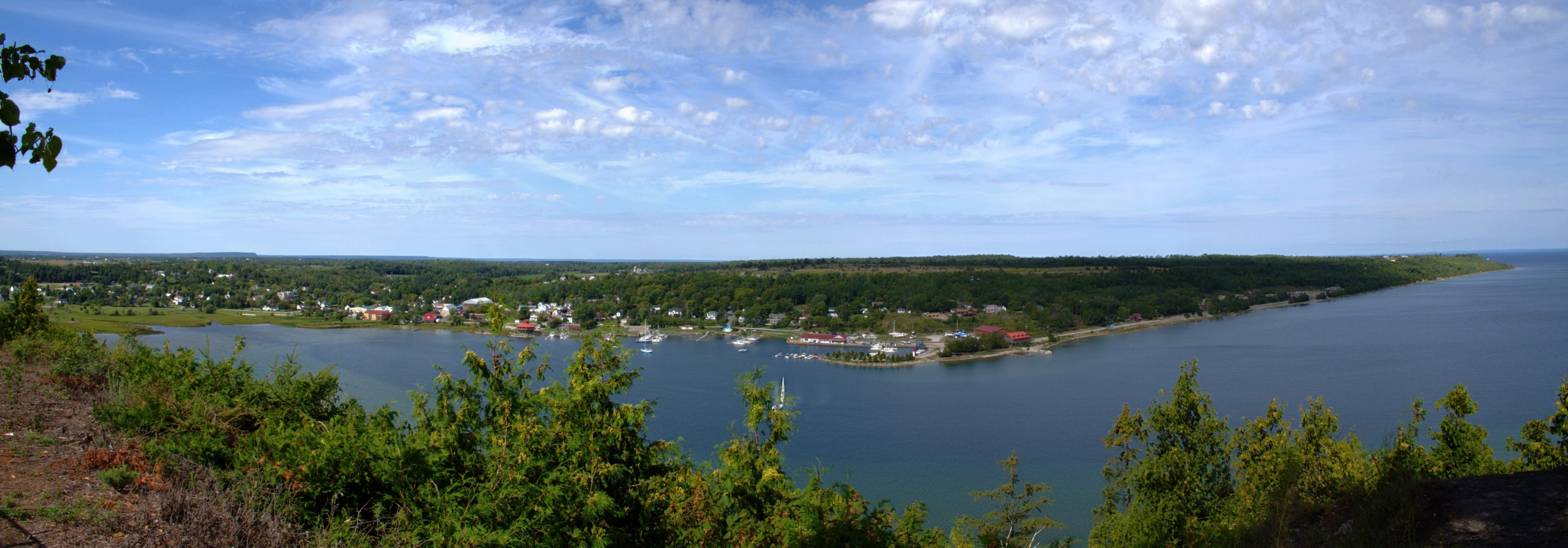
- Motto(s): Pristine, prosperous, proud.
- Location within Manitoulin District Location within Ontario
- Coordinates: 45°55′N 82°28′W
- Country: Canada
- Province: Ontario
- District: Manitoulin
- Settled: 1860s
- Incorporated: 1890

Government
  - Type: Town
  - Mayor: Ron Lane
  - Governing Body: Corporation of the Town of Gore Bay
  - MP: Jim Belanger (Conservative)
  - MPP: Bill Rosenberg (PC)

Area
  - Land: 5.14 km^{2} (1.98 sq mi)
- Elevation: 193.50 m (634.8 ft)

Population (2021)
  - Total: 808
  - Density: 157.2/km^{2} (407/sq mi)
- Time zone: UTC-5 (EST)
  - Summer (DST): UTC-4 (EDT)
- Postal code: P0P 1H0
- Area code: 705
- Website: www.gorebay.ca

Gore Bay is a town on Manitoulin Island in Ontario, Canada. Located on the namesake Gore Bay, a bay of Lake Huron's North Channel, it is one of the two incorporated towns of Manitoulin District, of which it is the administrative and government seat.

The town's name is believed to be referencing the gore-shaped harbour. Other theories for the namesake are probably for Francis Gore (1769–1852), Lieutenant-Governor of Upper Canada from 1806 to 1817, or after the steamer Gore (c. 1839 and scrapped 1861), which ran between Sault Ste. Marie and Collingwood from 1860 to 1870.

== History ==
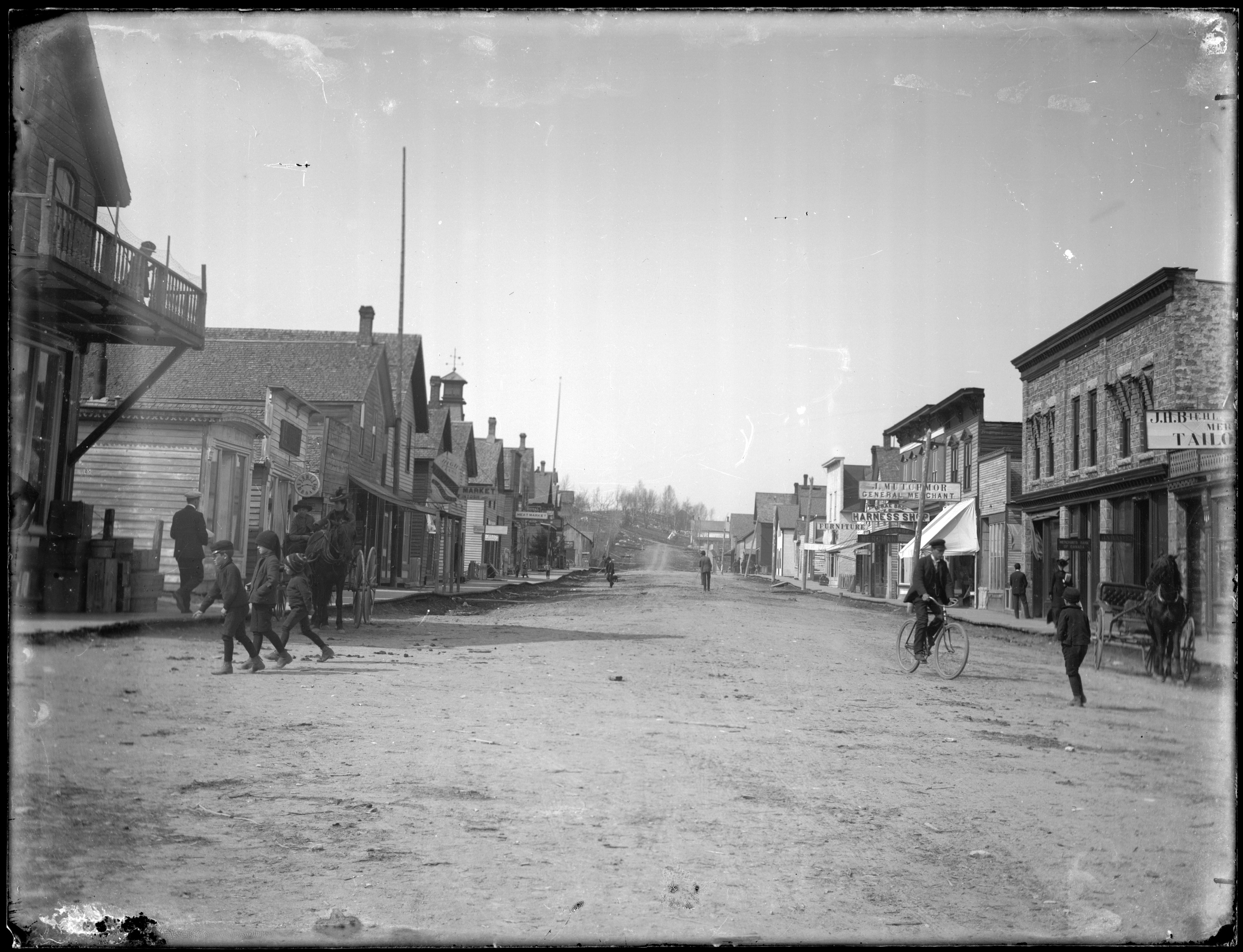
Gore Bay before the fire [190-?

After the Treaty of 1862, Manitoulin Island was open for white settlement. Small towns began to emerge from the wilderness, and hotels were developed to provide lodgings for prospective land purchasers. This led to the formation of the town Gore Bay. It was incorporated as a town on 7 April 1890.

Boats were regularly traveling from Sault Ste. Marie, Collingwood, and Owen Sound; establishing regular ports of call on Manitoulin Island, specifically Gore Bay, and prospering hotels due to increased traffic. The new hotel industry in Gore Bay welcomed commercial travellers, fishermen, doctors, lumbermen and tourists.

Three hotels served Gore Bay for many years:

- The Atlantic Hotel
- The Campbell House, located on the harbour
- The Ocean House and Pacific Hotel

Community life in Gore Bay has always been closely connected to water, in fact before roads were built, water was the only means available for travellers to get to the port of Gore Bay by boat. Boats would arrive and leave town with goods until the late 1950s, meaning the population was also quite low in the town's early years.

== Demographics ==
In the 2021 Census of Population conducted by Statistics Canada, Gore Bay had a population of 808 living in 382 of its 421 total private dwellings, a change of −6.8% from its 2016 population of 867. With a land area of 5.14 km^{2} (1.98 sq mi), it had a population density of 157.2/km^{2} (407.1/sq mi) in 2021.

Canada census – Gore Bay community profile

	2021	2016
Population	808 (-6.8% from 2016)	867 (2.0% from 2011)
Land area	5.14 km^{2} (1.98 sq mi)	5.23 km^{2} (2.02 sq mi)
Population density	157.2/km^{2} (407/sq mi)	165.7/km^{2} (429/sq mi)
Median age	56.8 (M: 55.2, F: 57.6)	56.1 (M: 53.8, F: 57.9)
Private dwellings	421 (total) 382 (occupied)	447 (total)
Median household income	$65,500

References: 2021 2016

Historical census populations – Gore Bay

Year	Pop.	±%
1891	472	—
1901	723	+53.2%
1911	703	−2.8%
1921	635	−9.7%
1931	672	+5.8%
1941	702	+4.5%
1951	752	+7.1%

Year	Pop.	±%
1956	731	−2.8%
1961	716	−2.1%
1966	693	−3.2%
1971	770	+11.1%
1976	767	−0.4%
1981	777	+1.3%
1986	829	+6.7%

Year	Pop.	±%
1991	916	+10.5%
1996	907	−1.0%
2001	898	−1.0%
2006	924	+2.9%
2011	850	−8.0%
2016	867	+2.0%
2021	808	−6.8%

Source: Statistics Canada

== Economy ==
Manitoulin Transport, one of Canada's largest trucking companies, is based in Gore Bay.

The first Gore Bay Highschool (which went up to grade 13, which wasn't common in Manitoulin district) now houses the Manitoulin Lodge Nursing home, and the only nursing home is located in Gore Bay. There is no longer any high school in Gore Bay; students get bussed to surrounding communities like M'Chigeeng First Nation/West Bay.

== Tourist attractions ==
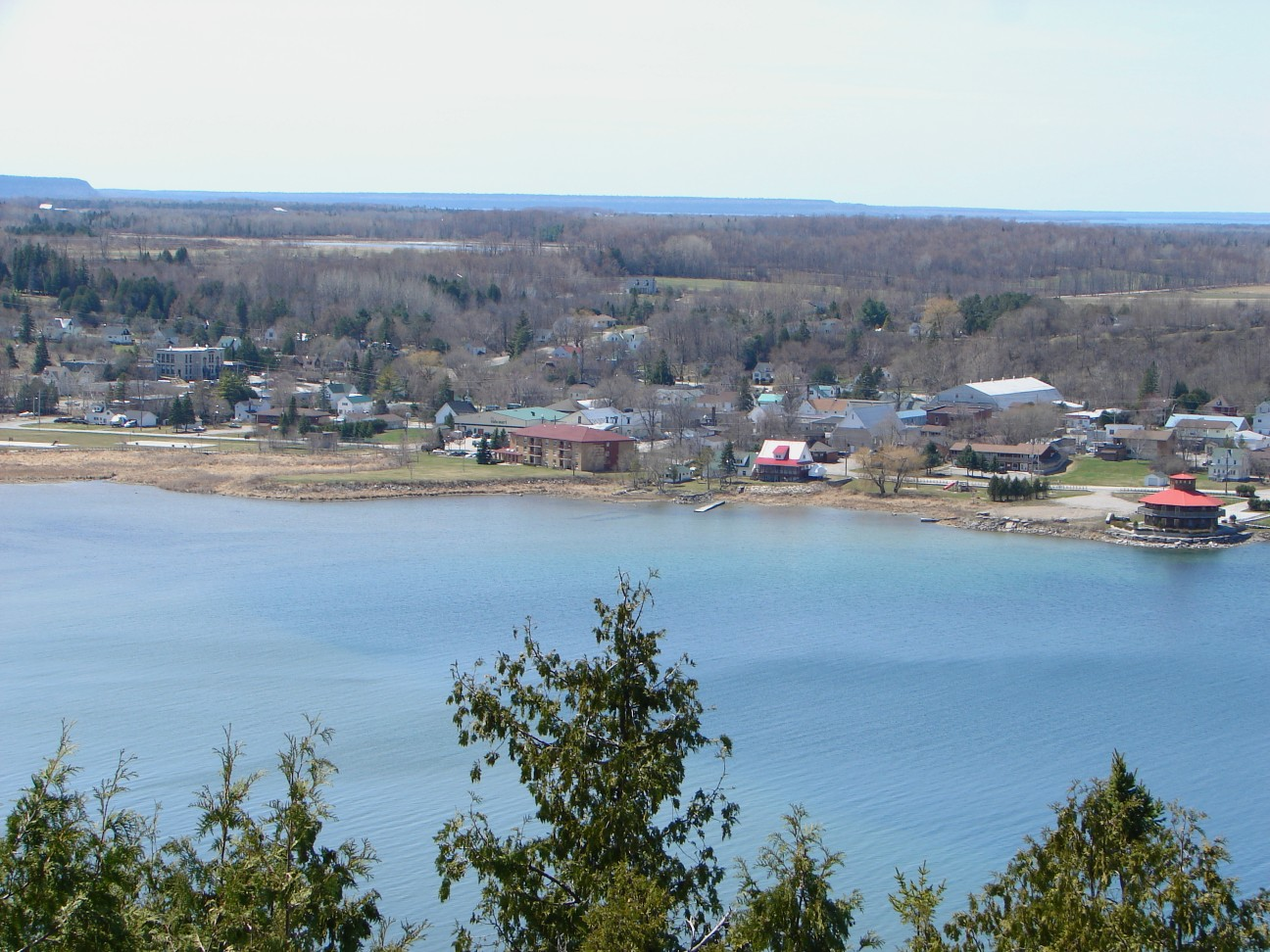
View from East Bluff Lookout onto Gore Bay.

- Gore Bay Museum – What now houses the Gore Bay Museum used to be the courthouse, a land office and a home for the jailer—with jail cells erected from 1889 when Gore Bay became the judicial seat of Manitoulin Island.
- East Bluff Lookout
- The Queens Hotel/Inn
- All Saints Anglican Church – oldest building in Gore Bay after the town went into flames in 1908.

== Climate ==
Gore Bay experiences a humid continental climate (Dfb). The highest temperature ever recorded in Gore Bay was 37.8 °C (100 °F) on 13 July 1936. The coldest temperature ever recorded was −38.9 °C (−38 °F) on 15 February 1943.

Climate data for Gore Bay-Manitoulin Airport, 1991−2020 normals, extremes 1915−present (Note: Extreme high and low temperatures in the table below were recorded at Gore Bay from October 1915 to October 1983 and at Gore Bay Airport from November 1983 to present.)
Month	Jan	Feb	Mar	Apr	May	Jun	Jul	Aug	Sep	Oct	Nov	Dec	Year
Record high °C (°F)	9.4 (48.9)	11.5 (52.7)	22.2 (72.0)	27.5 (81.5)	30.6 (87.1)	33.9 (93.0)	37.8 (100.0)	35.6 (96.1)	34.4 (93.9)	26.7 (80.1)	20.0 (68.0)	15.0 (59.0)	37.8 (100.0)
Mean daily maximum °C (°F)	−4.4 (24.1)	−3.6 (25.5)	1.5 (34.7)	9.0 (48.2)	16.4 (61.5)	21.9 (71.4)	24.4 (75.9)	24.0 (75.2)	19.5 (67.1)	12.2 (54.0)	5.4 (41.7)	−0.3 (31.5)	10.5 (50.9)
Daily mean °C (°F)	−9.0 (15.8)	−8.7 (16.3)	−3.5 (25.7)	4.0 (39.2)	11.0 (51.8)	16.5 (61.7)	19.4 (66.9)	19.1 (66.4)	14.9 (58.8)	8.3 (46.9)	2.2 (36.0)	−3.8 (25.2)	5.9 (42.6)
Mean daily minimum °C (°F)	−13.6 (7.5)	−13.8 (7.2)	−8.5 (16.7)	−1.1 (30.0)	5.4 (41.7)	11.0 (51.8)	14.3 (57.7)	14.1 (57.4)	10.2 (50.4)	4.5 (40.1)	−1.1 (30.0)	−7.2 (19.0)	1.2 (34.2)
Record low °C (°F)	−37.5 (−35.5)	−38.9 (−38.0)	−32.3 (−26.1)	−23.3 (−9.9)	−7.8 (18.0)	−1.7 (28.9)	1.1 (34.0)	0.0 (32.0)	−3.9 (25.0)	−9.4 (15.1)	−26.1 (−15.0)	−36.1 (−33.0)	−38.9 (−38.0)
Average precipitation mm (inches)	45.1 (1.78)	29.8 (1.17)	63.5 (2.50)	67.1 (2.64)	61.2 (2.41)	64.7 (2.55)	47.7 (1.88)	65.1 (2.56)	88.1 (3.47)	107.3 (4.22)	97.2 (3.83)	70.5 (2.78)	804.1 (31.66)
Average rainfall mm (inches)	10.5 (0.41)	4.1 (0.16)	41.7 (1.64)	56.7 (2.23)	61.1 (2.41)	64.7 (2.55)	47.7 (1.88)	65.1 (2.56)	88.1 (3.47)	105.8 (4.17)	71.8 (2.83)	28.6 (1.13)	645.9 (25.43)
Average snowfall cm (inches)	69.7 (27.4)	47.0 (18.5)	33.2 (13.1)	14.0 (5.5)	0.2 (0.1)	0.0 (0.0)	0.0 (0.0)	0.0 (0.0)	0.0 (0.0)	2.0 (0.8)	31.5 (12.4)	80.2 (31.6)	277.8 (109.4)
Average precipitation days (≥ 0.2 mm)	17.7	12.1	11.1	12.7	11.7	11.7	9.0	11.1	13.3	14.6	15.9	17.8	158.8
Average rainy days (≥ 0.2 mm)	2.8	2.2	6.2	10.7	11.8	11.9	9.0	11.2	13.4	14.9	11.4	5.2	110.5
Average snowy days (≥ 0.2 cm)	17.7	11.9	7.7	3.9	0.2	0.0	0.0	0.0	0.0	0.7	7.0	15.9	64.9
Average relative humidity (%) (at 15:00 LST)	74.3	70.0	63.6	57.9	56.9	58.5	59.0	60.8	64.7	68.2	73.4	77.6	65.4
Source: Environment Canada (precipitation/rainfall/snowfall 1981–2010)

== Transportation ==
Highway 540A and Highway 540B are the main roads in the town.

Gore Bay-Manitoulin Airport is located west southwest of Gore Bay, and one of two airports on Manitoulin Island. The airport is a general aviation facility.

== Notable people ==
- Ken Mackenzie. former baseball player for the New York Mets
- National Hockey League player Bobby Burns.

== See also ==
- List of townships in Ontario
