= North Channel (Ontario) =

Channel along the north shore of Lake Huron, Ontario, Canada

Coordinates: 46.06942°N 82.894592°W

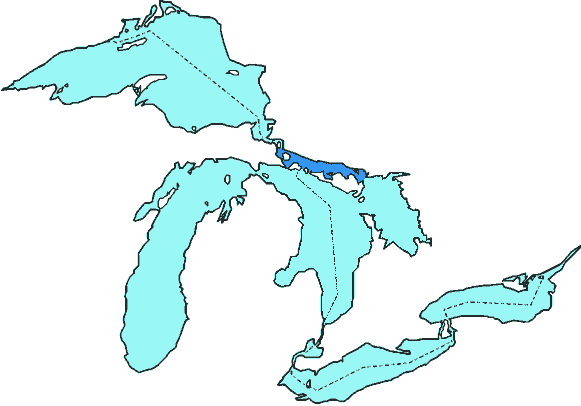
North Channel marked in dark blue.

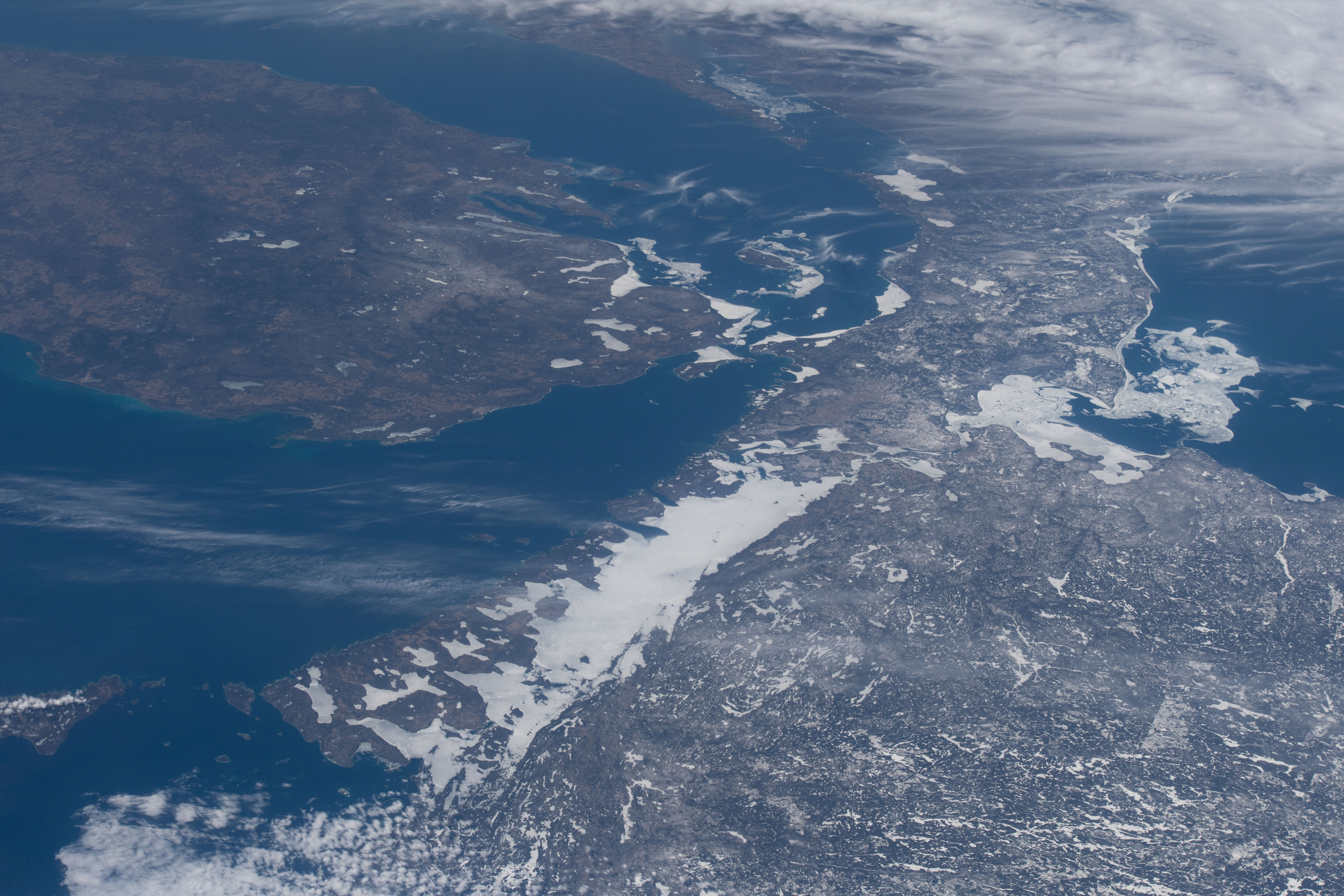
The North Channel, covered in ice. Taken from the International Space Station on April 10, 2022.

The North Channel is the body of water along the north shore of Lake Huron, in the Canadian province of Ontario and the state of Michigan in the United States of America. It stretches approximately 160 nautical miles (300 km) and is bordered on the east by Georgian Bay, on the west by the St. Marys River, to the north by the eastern Algoma District and part of the Sudbury District, and to the south by the islands of Manitoulin, Cockburn, Drummond and St. Joseph. At its widest point it is over 30 km (20 miles) wide.

In addition to Georgian Bay, the North Channel is connected to the main body of Lake Huron by the DeTour Passage, False Detour Channel and the Mississagi Strait, which separate the above-noted islands.

The channel is recognized as one of the best freshwater cruising grounds in the world. There are full-service marinas in various small communities along the shore providing sufficient provisions. A large section of the north shore is bordered by La Cloche Provincial Park providing for a scenic environment.

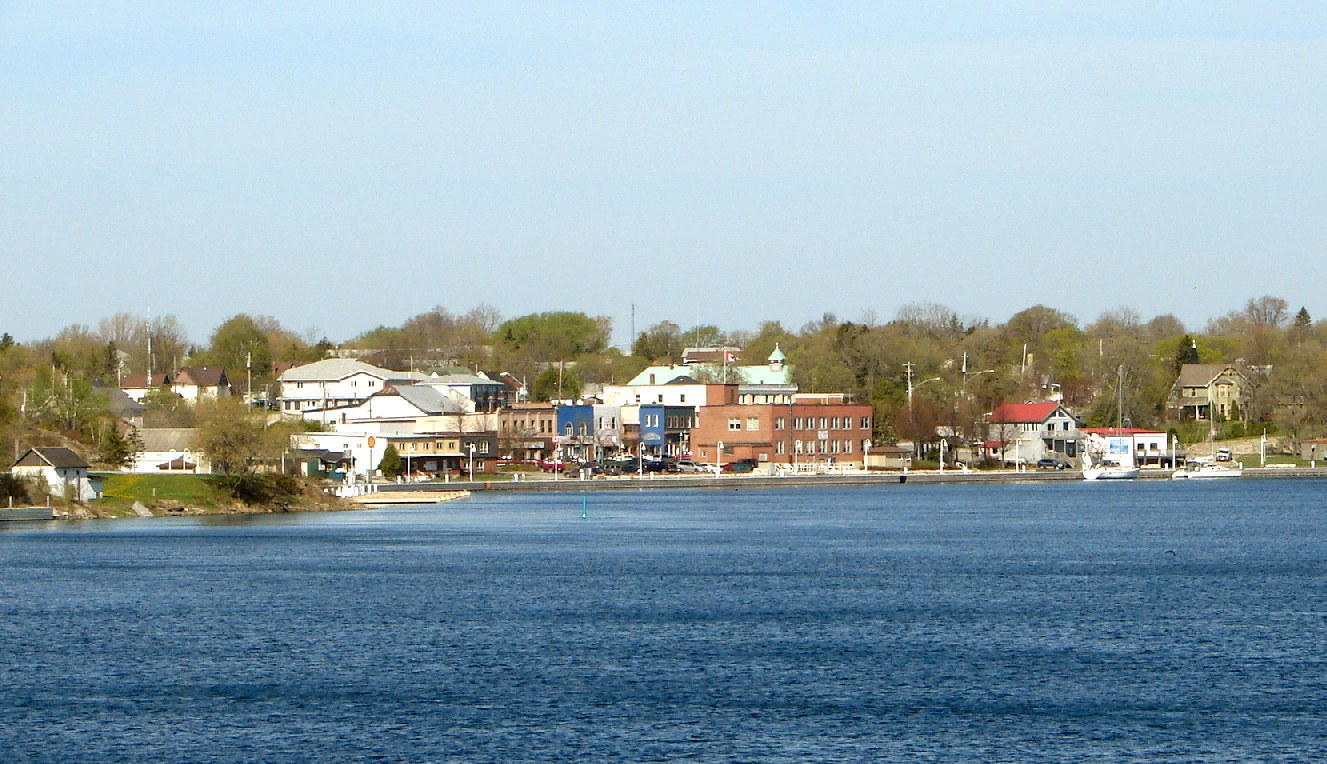
Little Current as seen across the North Channel

The only road crossings of the North Channel are at the Little Current Swing Bridge, which carries Highway 6 between Manitoulin Island and the mainland of Northern Ontario, and the Bernt Gilbertson Bridge, which carries Highway 548 from the mainland onto St. Joseph Island. The bridges are located at two of the narrowest points along the entire channel.

Some areas of the North Channel are protected by organizations such as the Georgian Bay Land Trust and Escarpment Biosphere Preserve.

The communities on the mainland side of the North Channel, between the townships of Tarbutt and Nairn and Hyman, are commonly grouped as the North Shore region. This designation does not generally include the communities on St. Joseph or Manitoulin islands.

== Waterways within North Channel ==
- Izaak Walton Bay
- Lake Nicolet
- Sturgeon Bay
