= SS Russia (1872) =

American Great Lakes package freighter

Coordinates: 45°51′44.2″N 83°50′22.3″W

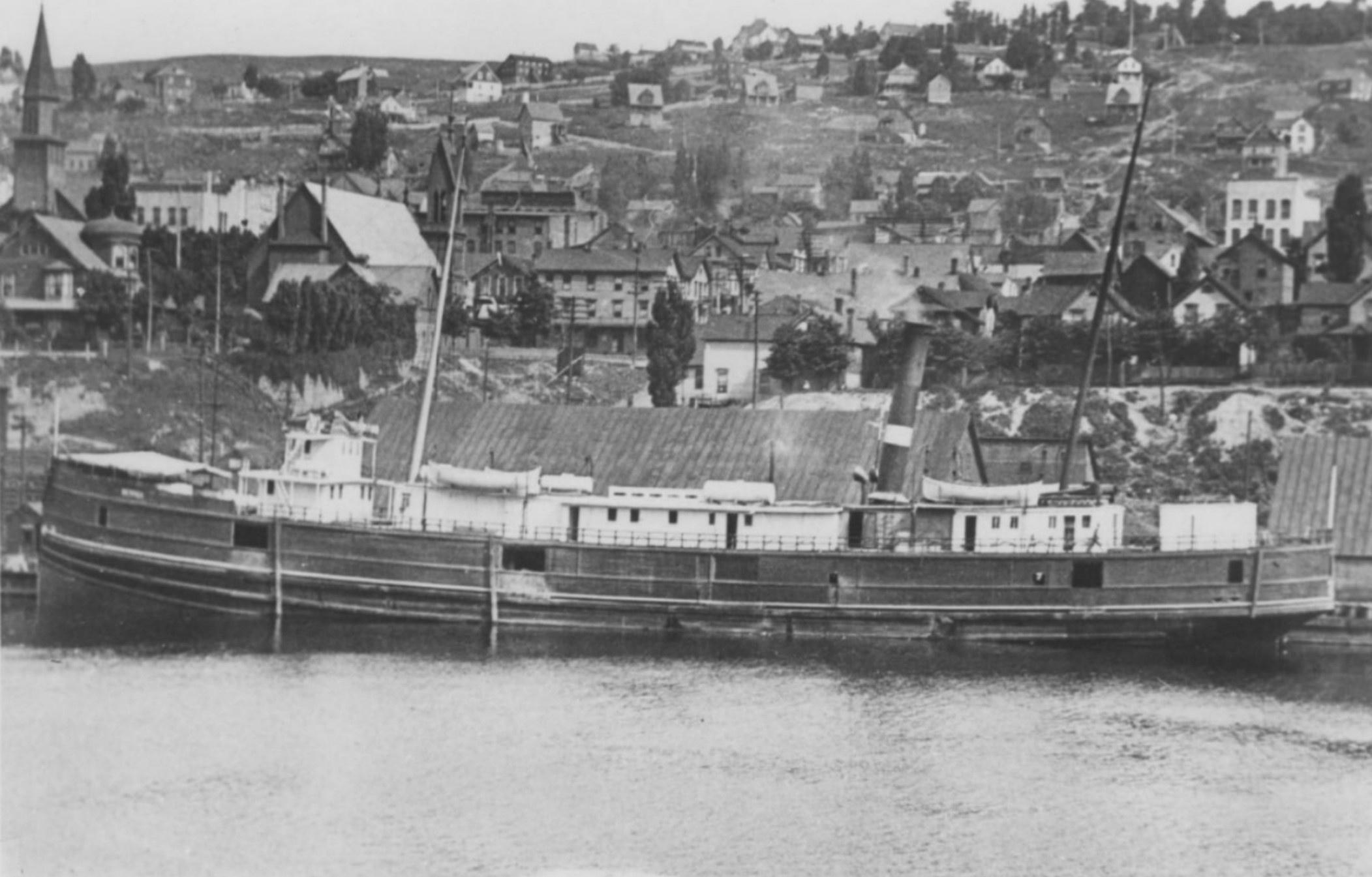
- Russia in Duluth, Minnesota, c. 1885

History

United States
- Name: Russia
- Namesake: Russia
- Owner: Charles O. Duncan
- Operator: Port Huron & Duluth Steamship Company of Port Huron, Michigan
- Port of registry: Duluth, Minnesota, United States
- Builder: King Iron Works of Buffalo, New York, Gibson & Craig subcontractor
- Yard number: 12
- Launched: August 20, 1872
- In service: August 26, 1872
- Out of service: April 30, 1909
- Identification: Registry number US 110063
- Fate: Sank off DeTour Village, Michigan
- Notes: Wreck discovered July 23, 2019

General characteristics
- Class & type: Package freighter
- Tonnage: 1,501.77 GRT; 1,334.57 NRT
- Length: 246 ft (75 m) LOA; 231.58 ft (70.59 m) LBP
- Beam: 35.58 ft (10.84 m)
- Depth: 13.35 ft (4.07 m)
- Installed power: Engines: 2 × 600 hp (450 kW) Steeple compound engines; Boilers: 2 × 75 psi firebox boilers
- Propulsion: 2 × fixed pitch propellers

SS Russia was an iron-hulled American Great Lakes package freighter that sank in a Lake Huron gale on April 30, 1909, near DeTour Village, Michigan, with all 22 of her crew and one passenger surviving.

Russia was built in 1872 in Buffalo, New York, by the King Iron Works, with the Gibson & Craig shipyard as the subcontractor. She was built for Charles Ensign of Buffalo and was operated as part of the Holt & Ensign Commercial Line, also of Buffalo. In 1884, after Ensign's death, Russia was sold for the first time. She would end up changing hands multiple times during her career.

In the evening of April 29, 1909, Russia left Alpena, Michigan, with a cargo of cement, wire fencing, galoshes and multiple barrels of dry goods, destined for Duluth, Minnesota. Around the time she passed Middle Island, the breeze which had been following Russia since she left Alpena suddenly began to strengthen; the combination of the gale and her heavy deck load caused Russia to roll severely. An eventual lull in the storm convinced Captain John McLean to continue towards Point DeTour, instead of turning back. However, Russia's cargo shifted, causing her to list to port. Her crew began to move her cargo of cement in order to compensate for the list; after about two hours, she righted herself. However, Russia suddenly rolled over to port and then over to starboard. Further efforts failed to counteract the list. Eventually, Captain McLean ordered the crew to throw the bags of cement into Lake Huron. When this effort to save Russia was also unsuccessful, Captain McLean gave the order to abandon her early in the morning of April 30. The crew and the one passenger boarded the lifeboats and rowed to the DeTour Reef Light.

The wreck of Russia was discovered in 220 feet (67 m) of water on July 23, 2019, over 110 years after she sank, by a team of shipwreck hunters led by Tom Farnquist of the Great Lakes Shipwreck Historical Society.

== History ==
In 1843, the gunship USS Michigan, built in Erie, Pennsylvania, became the first iron-hulled vessel built on the Great Lakes. Beginning in the mid-1840s, Canadian companies began importing iron vessels, prefabricated by shipyards in the United Kingdom. However, it would not be until 1862 that the first iron-hulled merchant ship, Merchant, was built on the Great Lakes. Despite the success of Merchant, wooden vessels remained preferable to iron ones until the 1880s, due to their inexpensiveness and the abundance of timber. In the early 1880s, shipyards around the lakes began constructing iron ships on a relatively large scale; in 1882, Onoko, an iron freighter, temporarily became the largest ship on the lakes. In 1884, the first steel freighters were built on the Great Lakes, and by the 1890s, the majority of ships constructed on the lakes were made of steel.

=== Design and construction ===
Russia (US official number 110063) was built in 1872 in Buffalo, New York, by the King Iron Works, with the Gibson & Craig shipyard as the subcontractor. She was built under the direction of master carpenter was David Bell. She was launched on August 20, 1872, as hull number #12. Russia was the third of five sister ships built between 1872 and 1873. She was preceded in construction by Cuba, Java and was succeeded in construction by Scotia and Arabia, although, some sources do not acknowledge Arabia as one of Russia's sister ships.

Russia's hull had an overall length of 246 feet (75 m) and a length between perpendiculars of 231.58 feet (70.59 m) (some sources state 231 feet (70 m), 231.7 feet (70.6 m) or 232 feet (71 m)). Her beam was 35.58 feet (10.84 m) (some sources state 35.6 feet (10.9 m), 35.7 feet (10.9 m) or 36 feet (11 m)) wide. Her hull was 13.35 feet (4.07 m) (some sources state 13 feet (4.0 m) or 13.3 feet (4.1 m)) deep. Russia had a gross register tonnage of 1,501.77 (one source states 1,501 and another states 1,502) tons and a net register tonnage of 1,334.57 (one source states 1,335) tons.

Russia was powered by two, two-cylinder 600 hp (450 kW) 72 rpm Steeple compound engines; the cylinders of these engines were 20 inches (51 cm) and 40 inches (100 cm) in diameter, and had a stroke of 36 inches (91 cm). Steam for the engines was produced by two 8 foot (2.4 m) × 16 foot (4.9 m) 75 psi firebox boilers. The engine and boilers were manufactured by the King Iron Works. She was propelled by two fixed pitch propellers.

Russia's hull was made of iron only up to her upper deck. Her upper works were made of wood. She had double bottom ballast tanks, two watertight bulkheads, a steel boilerhouse, two decks, cabins capable of accommodating up to 50 passengers, six cargo hatches and originally one, later two mast(s). She originally had two funnels. Russia had a cargo capacity of 100,000 bushels.

=== Service history ===
Russia was built for Charles Ensign of Buffalo, New York, and was operated as part of the Holt & Ensign Commercial Line, also of Buffalo. She received her first enrollment in Buffalo on August 26, 1872; her first home port was Buffalo. She originally ran between Buffalo, Milwaukee, Wisconsin and Chicago, Illinois.

On December (one source states November) 6/7, 1872, at around 9:00 A.M., while bound for Buffalo with a cargo of grain, Russia struck a rock and sank at Bar Point, Lake Erie, near Amherstburg, Ontario. She sustained severe bottom damage. On December 9, she was raised and towed to Detroit, Michigan. The total loss amounted to $69,000. In July 1873, Russia's machinery became disabled, causing $600 worth of damage. In August of that same year, Russia struck a boulder at Lime Kiln crossing in the Detroit River, near Amherstburg. She was repaired for $9,070. On September 12, 1873, while bound from Chicago for Buffalo with a cargo of wheat, Russia collided with the steamer John A. Dix in the Detroit River, receiving $3,000 worth of damage. She was repaired when she reached Buffalo. On February 1, 1874, Russia was damaged by freshet in Buffalo, sustaining $300 worth of damage. On September 16, 1874, Russia ran aground in Buffalo Harbor opposite Central Wharf. In November of that same year, Russia lost part of her rigging, including her gaff rig, on Lake Erie. In October 1876, Russia's machinery became disabled on Lake Erie. She was towed to Port Colborne, Ontario, by the steamer Granite State.

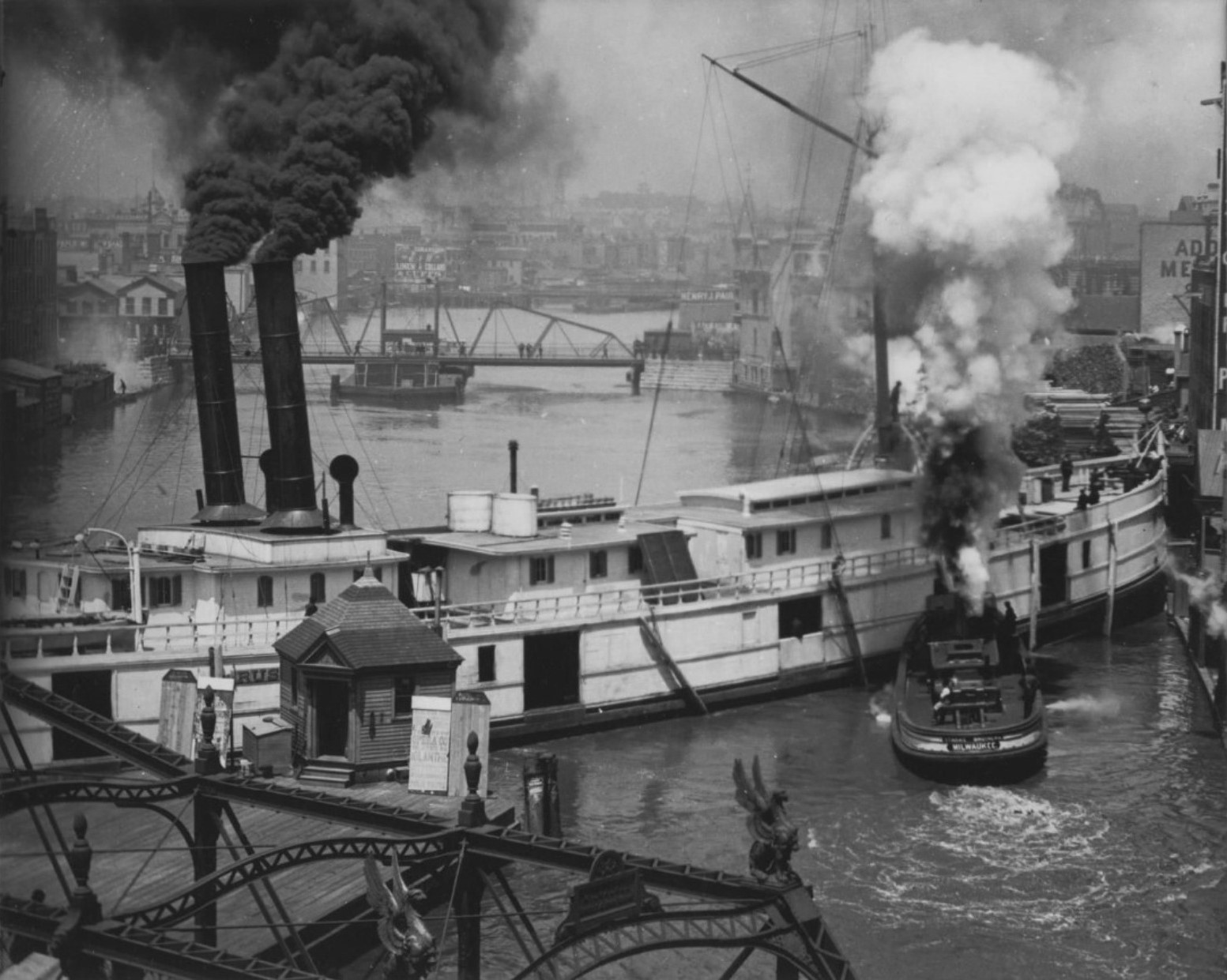
Russia in Milwaukee, Wisconsin c. 1880

In 1884, following the death of Charles Ensign, Russia was sold to James Ash of Buffalo (one source also gives several co-owners: P. P. Pratt, F. L. Danforth and G. B. Rich). In 1886, Russia ran between Buffalo and Green Bay, Wisconsin. On June 1, 1886, Russia collided with and sank the schooner Thomas P. Sheldon in Lake George. The damage she sustained in the collision was repaired in Buffalo. In 1888 (one source states 1890), Russia was sold to the Lackawanna Transportation Company of Buffalo, which was managed by Drake & Maytham. At this time, she ran between Lake Erie, Milwaukee and Chicago.

On May 1/3, 1892, at around 6:00 P.M., while bound from Buffalo for Chicago with a cargo of coal, Russia collided with the steamer Celtic in a dense fog about 15 miles (24 km) off Rondeau, Ontario. Celtic struck Russia on her port bow, near the waterline. Celtic sank in less than ten minutes, taking one of her crew of 18 with her. After rescuing Celtic's crew, Russia was beached to prevent her from sinking. She was raised, and with the help of the tug Balize, made it to Buffalo where her coal was unloaded. On June 5/9 1893, Russia ran aground on Beaver Island, Michigan, in fog, and was eventually released.

On July 11, 1893, Russia was in Buffalo, loading a cargo of baled jute, rags, French clay and wood pulp. As the bales of jute were being loaded into her hold, two of the bales spontaneously combusted near the third bulkhead, just forward of the engine room. When the crew members in the hold became aware of the fire, they rushed to the deck and gave the alarm. Russia's fire hose was turned on in her hold, but failed to have much of an impact on the fire. Russia began warning other ships in the area of the fire using her whistle. By the time the fireboat John M. Hutchinson reached Russia, the fire had already burned through two of Russia's decks, damaged her forward cabins and her engine room. John M. Hutchinson and several fire engines began pumping water into her hold. By noon, after two hours of fighting the fire, Russia's hull had been filled with water, finally extinguishing the fire and causing her to list 18 feet (5.5 m) to port. She was repaired in Buffalo, with the repairs costing $15,000.

On July 31, 1893, as soon as Russia left drydock, she collided with the freighter Thomas W. Palmer. Her bow made contact with Thomas W. Palmer's hull, damaging her aft upper works and breaking several stanchions. Russia sustained no damage. On August 9, 1895/1896 (most sources state the 1895, but some also state 1896), Russia was upbound without cargo in the Detroit River. At around 4:00 P.M., she sighted the freighter Britannic, which was downbound with a cargo of iron ore. The vessels signaled each other, but just as they were about to pass each other, Britannic suddenly veered to port, putting her directly in Russia's path. The bow of Russia sliced into Britannic's hull, amidships on her starboard side. Britannic sank with the loss of one life into 30 feet (9.1 m) of water off Wyandotte, Michigan; Russia had a hole punched in her bow and was eventually repaired in Buffalo. Sometime in 1897, Russia became trapped in ice in Green Bay. She was freed by the steamer Algomah. On May 13, 1897, at 5:30 A.M. while downbound, Russia ran aground on Mackinac Point in dense fog. She was freed at 3:30 P.M. on the same day by the wrecking tug Favorite.

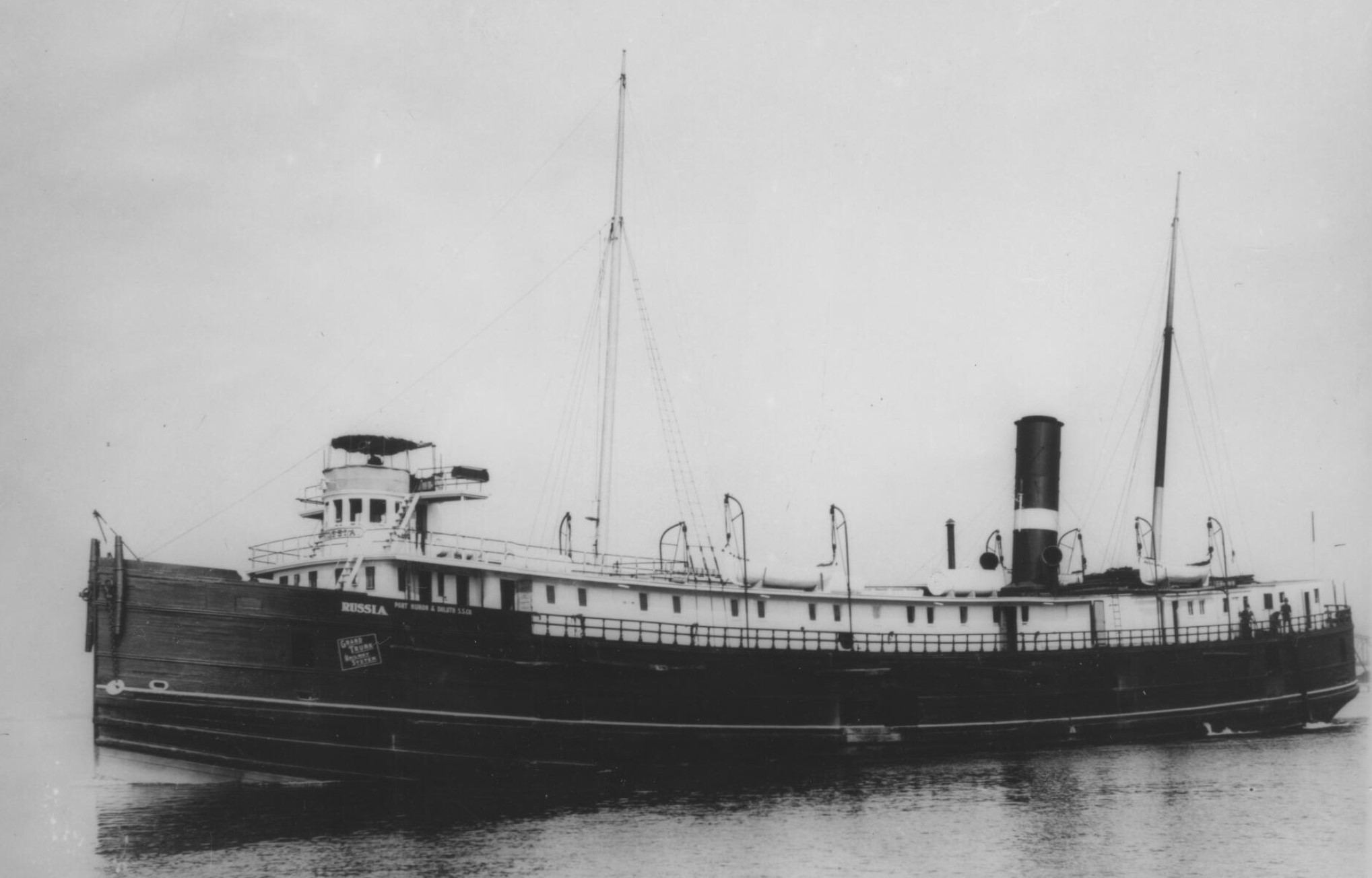
Russia as she appeared in 1903

In the summer of 1900, Russia was sold to the Lake Transit Company of Duluth, Minnesota (one source states Buffalo), managed by John J. McWilliams. Her home port was changed to Duluth. In 1905/1907, Russia was sold to the Port Huron & Duluth Steamship Company of either Port Huron, Michigan, or Duluth. The company was owned and managed by Charles O. Duncan.

=== Final voyage ===
On April 29, 1909, Russia was in Alpena, Michigan, loading a cargo of 1,000 bags of cement. She was already loaded with two train cars filled with wire fencing, 1000 pairs of galoshes, barrels of various dry goods and rumoured 1909 motorcycles destined for Duluth, Minnesota. As she was loading her cargo, a steady breeze began to build. In the evening of April 29, Russia left Alpena for Duluth under the command of Captain John McLean of Port Huron, Michigan, for what was to be her first trip of the shipping season. As well as Captain McLean, there were 21 crewmen and one unidentified passenger on board. As Russia headed out into the open lake, towards the DeTour Passage, the breeze began to strengthen. Around the time she passed Middle Island, the breeze grew into strong gale. Due to the gale and her heavy deck load, Russia began to roll severely. An eventual lull in the storm convinced Captain John to continue towards Point DeTour, instead of turning back. However, Russia's cargo shifted, causing her to list to port. In order to counteract the list, Russia's crew began moving the 64-pound (29 kg) bags of cement. After about two hours of what Captain McLean described as "back-breaking labour", she righted herself. However, Russia suddenly rolled over to port, caught herself, and rolled over to starboard. The crew once again tried to counteract the list, but this time they were unsuccessful. After the fruitless efforts to counteract the list, Captain McLean ordered the crew to begin throwing the bags of cement into Lake Huron. When this effort to save Russia also failed, Captain McLean gave the order to abandon her early in the morning of April 30. The crew of 22 and the one passenger boarded the lifeboats, rowing 12 miles (19 km) to the DeTour Point Light. The crew arrived back in Detroit, Michigan on May 2, 1909.

== Russia wreck ==
=== Discovery ===
For several years, Russia was sought by shipwreck hunters. Paul Ehorn of Waukegan, Illinois, spent twenty summers on Lake Huron trying to find her wreck. Although unsuccessful in finding Russia, Ehorn managed to find the wreck of the schooner barge Celtic, lost with all hands on November 29, 1902.

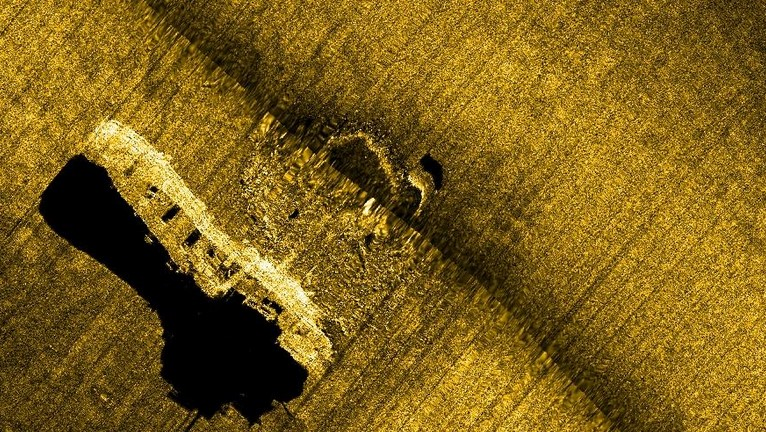
Sonar image of Russia taken by archaeologists from the Thunder Bay National Marine Sanctuary

Tom Farnquist, founding member and Director Emeritus of the Great Lakes Shipwreck Historical Society (GLSHS) had had aspirations of locating Russia for several years, saying that she had "been on his bucket list since his late teens". Over the years, he had gathered several old newspaper accounts to help him track down her wreck.

In the winter of 2018/2019, Farnquist contacted veteran ship hunters Jerry Eliason and Ken Merryman (of Cloquet, Minnesota, and Fridley, Minnesota, respectively), requesting their assistance in finding Russia's wreck. Ehorn shared the GPS coordinates for the wreck of Celtic with Farnquist, helping significantly reduce the search area for Russia. Farnquist, Eliason and Merryman set out to find her wreck in July 2019, beginning the search operations on July 22. On July 23, the second day of their search operations, they managed to locate the wreck of Russia in 220 feet (67 m) of water, just outside the boundary of the 1,440 square mile (3,700 km^{2}) Thunder Bay National Marine Sanctuary. Ironically, Russia's wreck was discovered only 1,200 feet (370 m) from where Ehorn located the wreck of Celtic.

Farnquist invited technical divers John Janzen and John Scoles (of Madison, Wisconsin and Minneapolis, Minnesota respectively) to capture footage of her wreck. Archaeologists from the Thunder Bay National Marine Sanctuary and the Michigan Department of Natural Resources conducted sonar imaging of the wreck. The Michigan State Police were also invited to capture additional video footage of the wreck, using a Remotely operated vehicle (ROV) to capture it.

3D rendering of Russia's wreck

=== Russia today ===
The wreck of Russia rests on an even keel in 220 feet (67 m) of water near the De Tour Passage, mostly intact. Her wooden cabins broke away when she sank, leaving only her steel aft cabins, boiler house and galley area intact. Her mizzen mast remains in place. There are dozens of unopened wooden crates stored below her decks which are visible through the exposed cargo hatches. Her wooden stock anchors are still in place on her starboard bow. There is a large field of debris surrounding her wreck.

As the wreck of Russia rests in Michigan waters, all artefacts on board are the property of the state and as such cannot be brought to the surface without its permission.

== Sources ==
- "Cuba (1872, Package Freighter)". Alpena, Michigan: Alpena County George N. Fletcher Public Library. 2020.
- "Java (1873, Package Freighter)". Alpena, Michigan: Alpena County George N. Fletcher Public Library. 2020b.
- "Russia (1873, Package Freighter)". Alpena, Michigan: Alpena County George N. Fletcher Public Library. 2020c.
- "Scotia (1873, Package Freighter)". Alpena, Michigan: Alpena County George N. Fletcher Public Library. 2020d.
- "USRC John A. Dix (1865, Revenue Cutter)". Alpena, Michigan: Alpena County George N. Fletcher Public Library. 2020e.
- Balfour, David (2020). "The Actions of the H.P. Bope, L.C. Hanna, J.G. Munro, and the Tragedy of the Clarion on December 8, 1909". Toledo, Ohio: National Museum of the Great Lakes.
- Berry, Sterling (2020). "Arabia". Detroit, Michigan: Great Lakes Vessel Histories of Sterling Berry.
- Berry, Sterling (2020b). "Russia". Detroit, Michigan: Great Lakes Vessel Histories of Sterling Berry.
- Bowling Green State University (2010). "Russia". Bowling Green, Ohio: Bowling Green State University.
- Bowlus, W. Bruce (2010). Iron Ore Transport on the Great Lakes: The Development of a Delivery System to Feed American Industry. Jefferson, North Carolina: McFarland & Company, Inc. ISBN 978-0-7864-8655-7.
- Bugbee, Gordon P. (February 1962a). "Iron Merchant Ships: An Upper Lakes Centennial - Part One" (PDF). Telescope. 11 (2). Detroit: Great Lakes Maritime Institute: 24–27 – via Maritime History of the Great Lakes.
- Bugbee, Gordon P. (March 1962b). "Iron Merchant Ships: An Upper Lakes Cenntenial – Part Two" (PDF). Telescope. 11 (3). Detroit: Great Lakes Maritime Institute: 46–51 – via Maritime History of the Great Lakes.
- Brand, Scott (2019). "110-year-old Great Lakes Shipwreck Mystery Solved". Sault Ste Marie, Michigan: Sault Ste. Marie Evening News. Archived from the original on September 23, 2020.
- Della-Mattia, Ellen (2019). "Elusive 110-year-old shipwreck discovered on Lake Huron". Sault Ste. Marie, Ontario: The Sault Star.
- Eliason, Jerry (2019). "Shipwreck Russia". Fridley, Minnesota: Great Lakes Shipwreck Preservation Society - 3D Shipwrecks.
- Krueger, Andrew (2020). "Minnesota shipwreck hunters locate long-sought Lake Michigan wreck". Minnesota: Minnesota Public Radio.
- "Cuba (Propeller), 10 May 1872". Ontario, Canada: Maritime History of the Great Lakes. 1872.
- "Russia (Propeller), U110063, 20 Aug 1872". Ontario, Canada: Maritime History of the Great Lakes. 1872b.
- "Russia (Propeller), U110063, aground, 7 Dec 1872". Ontario, Canada: Maritime History of the Great Lakes. 1872.
- "Russia (Propeller), U110063, collision, 1 Sep 1873". Ontario, Canada: Maritime History of the Great Lakes. 1873.
- "Russia (Propeller), U110063, freshet, 1 Feb 1874". Ontario, Canada: Maritime History of the Great Lakes. 1874.
- "Russia (Propeller), U110063, aground, 1 Sep 1874". Ontario, Canada: Maritime History of the Great Lakes. 1874b.
- "Russia (Propeller), U110063, lost gaff and outfit, 1 Nov 1874". Ontario, Canada: Maritime History of the Great Lakes. 1874c.
- "Russia (Propeller), U110063, collision, 1 Jun 1886". Ontario, Canada: Maritime History of the Great Lakes. 1886.
- "Thomas P. Sheldon (Schooner), U24871, sunk by collision, 1 Jun 1886". Ontario, Canada: Maritime History of the Great Lakes. 1886b.
- "Russia (Propeller), U110063, collision & aground, 1 May 1892". Ontario, Canada: Maritime History of the Great Lakes. 1892.
- "Russia (Propeller), U110063, collision, 31 Jul 1893". Ontario, Canada: Maritime History of the Great Lakes. 1893.
- "Russia (Propeller), U110063, collision, 31 Jul 1893". Ontario, Canada: Maritime History of the Great Lakes. 1893b.
- "Thomas W. Palmer (Propeller), collision, 31 Jul 1893". Ontario, Canada: Maritime History of the Great Lakes. 1893c.
- "Russia (Propeller), U110063, collision, 9 Aug 1895". Ontario, Canada: Maritime History of the Great Lakes. 1895.
- "Russia (Propeller), U110063, aground, 13 May 1897". Ontario, Canada: Maritime History of the Great Lakes. 1897.
- "Russia (Propeller), sunk, 30 Apr 1909". Ontario, Canada: Maritime History of the Great Lakes. 1909.
- Sault Ste. Marie Evening News (2019). "Team uncovers long-lost Great Lakes shipwreck". Sault Ste Marie, Michigan. Archived from the original on October 22, 2019.
- Swayze, David D. (2001). "Great Lakes Shipwrecks - R". Port Huron, Michigan: Boatnerd.
- Thompson, Mark L. (1994). Queen of the Lakes. Detroit, Michigan: Wayne State University Press. ISBN 0-8143-2393-6.
- Toronto Marine Historical Society (1972). "Ship of the Month No.22 Maplebranch". Toronto, Ontario: Toronto Marine Historical Society.
- Toronto Marine Historical Society (1993). "Ship of the Month No.203 Celtic". Toronto, Ontario: Toronto Marine Historical Society.
- University of California (1909). Merchant vessels of the United States. 1908-09. 1936/37-1939/41: Report series, no.[1], 4, 8, 11. Oakland, California: University of California.
- Wrecksite (2017). "SS Russia (+1909)". Affligem, Belgium: Wrecksite.
