= List of shipwrecks in October 1888 =

The list of shipwrecks in October 1888 includes ships sunk, foundered, grounded, or otherwise lost during October 1888.

== 1 October ==
List of shipwrecks: 1 October 1888
Ship	State	Description
St. Clair	United States	The barge foundered in a gale in the Lake Huron off Sand Beach Harbor, Michigan with the loss of her Captain and 5 crew.

== 2 October ==
List of shipwrecks: 2 October 1888
Ship	State	Description
Silas Fish	United Kingdom	The barque foundered in the Atlantic Ocean off the Turks Islands with the loss of thirteen of the fifteen people on board. She was on a voyage from Vara to New York, United States.

== 3 October ==
List of shipwrecks: 3 October 1888
Ship	State	Description
Ohio	United States	The barque was driven ashore and wrecked in a gale and snowstorm at Point Hope (68°20′20″N 166°50′40″W) on the Chukchi Sea coast of the District of Alaska, with the loss of 25 of her 33 crew members. The eight survivors were rescued eight months later.

== 4 October ==
List of shipwrecks: 4 October 1888
Ship	State	Description
Catherine	United Kingdom	The brig was abandoned in the North Sea off Winterton-on-Sea, Norfolk. Her crew were rescued by the Winterton Lifeboat.
Gefion	Denmark	The schooner was abandoned in the North Sea. Her crew were rescued by the fishing lugger Scud (United Kingdom). Gefion was on a voyage from Northfleet, Kent to Leith, Lothian, United Kingdom.
Kildare	United Kingdom	The steamship foundered in the South China Sea (14°39′N 109°58′E) with the loss of four of her crew. She was on a voyage from Pasoeroewan, Netherlands East Indies to Hong Kong.
Sutherfield	United Kingdom	The barque was destroyed by fire in the Pacific Ocean (46°30′S 84°00′W). Her crew took to the boats; they were rescued the next day by the barque Adventurer (United Kingdom). Sutherfield was on a voyage from Pisagua, Chile to a British port.

== 5 October ==
List of shipwrecks: 5 October 1888
Ship	State	Description
Brampton	United Kingdom	The steamship ran aground on rocks in the Rabbit Islands, Ottoman Empire.
Emily	Norway	The barque collided with the barque Svea (Russia) at Bordeaux, Gironde, France and was severely damaged.
Madeleine	France; United Kingdom	The fishing boat was run into by the steamship Queen (United Kingdom) and sank in the Grand Banks of Newfoundland with the loss of 20 of her 24 crew.
Nor	Norway	The barque was abandoned in the North Sea. Her crew were rescued by the steamship Grenville (United Kingdom). Nor was on a voyage from Kronstadt, Russia to Montrose, Forfarshire, United Kingdom.
Tolfaen	United Kingdom	The steamer capsized in heavy seas off Colwyn Bay, Wales while en route for Ireland from Liverpool. Five of the crew drowned.

== 6 October ==
List of shipwrecks: 6 October 1888
Ship	State	Description
Gracie	United Kingdom	The steamship was run into by the steamship Ferndale (United Kingdom) at Newcastle upon Tyne, Northumberland and was severely damaged.
Matthew M. Murray	United States	The schooner was wrecked at Louisbourg, Nova Scotia, Canada.

== 7 October ==
List of shipwrecks: 7 October 1888
Ship	State	Description
Kars	Germany	The steamship sank in the North Sea 63 nautical miles (117 km) north of the mouth of the Weser. All on board were rescued by the smack Challenger (United Kingdom). Kars was on a voyage from Saint Petersburg, Russia to Amsterdam, North Holland, Netherlands.

== 10 October ==
List of shipwrecks: 10 October 1888
Ship	State	Description
Harold	United Kingdom	The steamship was driven ashore at the mouth of the River Weaver. She was on a voyage from Garston, Lancashire to the Weston Point Docks, Cheshire.

== 13 October ==
List of shipwrecks: 13 October 1888
Ship	State	Description
Annie	United Kingdom	The ketch was abandoned at sea. Her three crew were rescued by the steamship Alsatian (United Kingdom).
Carl	United Kingdom	The Thames barge collided with London Bridge and sank in the River Thames.
Gertie	United Kingdom	The Thames barge was holed by the propeller of the steamship Hawk (United Kingdom) and sank in the River Thames at Wapping, Middlesex.

== 16 October ==
List of shipwrecks: 16 October 1888
Ship	State	Description
Clara	Norway	The barque was abandoned in the Atlantic Ocean. Her crew were rescued by the barque Charlotte and Anna (Germany). Clara was on a voyage from Fowey, Cornwall, United Kingdom to New York, United States.
Ville de Calais	France	The steamship exploded at Calais and was a total loss.

== 17 October ==
List of shipwrecks: 17 October 1888
Ship	State	Description
C. A.	United Kingdom	The ship collided with the steamship Pallion (United Kingdom) off the Isles of Scilly. She was on a voyage from Muros, Spain to Cardiff, Glamorgan. She completed her voyage waterlogged at the bow.
Denmark	United Kingdom	The steamship was driven ashore near Dagenham, Essex. She was on a voyage from New York to London. She was refloated the next day and completed her voyage.
Secret	(United Kingdom of Great Britain and Ireland) Guernsey	The ketch was lost at Jersey, Channel Islands. Her crew were rescued.

== 18 October ==
List of shipwrecks: 18 October 1888
Ship	State	Description
Rachael Harrison	United Kingdom	The ship was driven ashore at Cranfield Point, County Down. She was on a voyage from Newport, Monmouthshire to Newry, County Antrim. She was refloated and taken in to Warrenpoint, County Antrim in a severely leaky condition.

== 19 October ==
List of shipwrecks: 19 October 1888
Ship	State	Description
Ernest	United Kingdom	The steamship ran aground on the West Rocks, in the North Sea off the coast of Essex. She was on a voyage from Skutskär, Sweden to Calais, France. She was refloated the next day with assistance from the tugs Harwich and Robert Owen (both United Kingdom) and resumed her voyage.
Hooker	United Kingdom	The ship was driven ashore at Murvey, County Galway with the loss of two lives. She was on a voyage from Rounstone, County Galway to Galway.
Merlin	United Kingdom	The steam fishing boat was driven ashore at "Donought", Aberdeenshire.
Neptune	United Kingdom	The steamship collided with another steamship and foundered at sea. Her crew were rescued. She was on a voyage from Stettin, Germany to Glasgow, Renfrewshire.

== 20 October ==
List of shipwrecks: 20 October 1888
Ship	State	Description
Bay of Cadiz	United Kingdom	The ship departed from Newcastle, New South Wales for San Francisco, California. No further trace, reported overdue.
Fair City	United Kingdom	The ship was abandoned off Land's End, Cornwall. She was on a voyage from Newport, Monmouthshire to Plymouth, Devon.
Reed Case	United States	The schooner was wrecked in Lake Superior with the loss of her Captain.
1,631	France	The fishing boat was driven ashore at Hastings, Sussex, United Kingdom. The sole crew member aboard was rescued.

== 21 October ==
List of shipwrecks: 21 October 1888
Ship	State	Description
Presto	United Kingdom	The steamship collided with the steamship Cameo (United Kingdom) in the River Thames at Gravesend, Kent and was beached.

== 23 October ==
List of shipwrecks: 23 October 1888
Ship	State	Description
Farnley Hall	United Kingdom	The steamship was run into by the steamship Medway (United Kingdom) at Newport, Monmouthshire and sank.
Lady Bertha	United Kingdom	The steamship was driven ashore at "Sandakrog", Iceland. Salvage was declared impossible.

== 24 October ==
List of shipwrecks: 24 October 1888
Ship	State	Description
Despatch	United Kingdom	The steamship collided with the steamship Gertrude (United Kingdom) and sank in the North Sea off the coast of Norfolk. Her crew were rescued by the steamship Fenton (United Kingdom).
Luna	United Kingdom	The ship departed from Newport, Monmouthshire for Barnstaple, Devon. No further trace, reported overdue.
Unnamed	Flag unknown	The steamship ran aground on the Goodwin Sands, Kent, United Kingdom.

== 25 October ==
List of shipwrecks: 25 October 1888
Ship	State	Description
Dina	Netherlands	The brig was abandoned in the Atlantic Ocean (41°30′N 24°20′W). Her crew were rescued by the schooner Rippling Wave (United Kingdom). Dina was on a voyage from Tobago to Falmouth, Cornwall, United Kingdom.
Emma	United Kingdom	The schooner was run into by the barque E. W. Trickett (United States) and was abandoned in the English Channel 6 nautical miles (11 km) off the Royal Sovereign Lightship ( Trinity House). All five people on board were rescued by E. W. Trickett. Emma was on a voyage from Portland, Dorset to London. She was towed in to Dover, Kent on 27 October.
Makah	United States	The whaler, a barque, was wrecked in a hurricane in Tillamook Bay with the loss of all 35 crew.

== 26 October ==
List of shipwrecks: 26 October 1888
Ship	State	Description
Caldwell	United States	The schooner foundered off Old Providence, Colombia with the loss of nineteen of the 28 people on board. Survivors took to a boat; they were rescued on 28 October by the steamship Gussie (United Kingdom).
Dublin	United Kingdom	The steamship collided with the steamship Longford (United Kingdom) and sank off Great Orme Head, Caernarfonshire. Her crew were rescued by Longford.
Swallow	United Kingdom	The schooner was driven ashore at Holyhead, Anglesey. She was later refloated.

== 27 October ==
List of shipwrecks: 27 October 1888
Ship	State	Description
Emiliano	Spain	The steamship ran aground at Savannah, Georgia, United States. She was refloated but ran aground on the Tybee Knoll.
Sleipner	Norway	The schooner was driven ashore and wrecked at "Stamoe", near Hamina, Grand Duchy of Finland. She was on a voyage from Kronstadt, Russia to Macduff, Aberdeenshire, United Kingdom.

== 28 October ==
List of shipwrecks: 28 October 1888
Ship	State	Description
Falshaw	United Kingdom	The steamship ran aground on the Blyth Sand, in the Thames Estuary. She was on a voyage from Kronstadt, Russia to London.
Unnamed	Flag unknown	The fishing smack was run down and sunk in the North Sea 86 nautical miles (159 km) off the Elbe Lightship (Germany) by the steamship Prins Wilhelm (Germany). All hands were lost.

== 29 October ==
List of shipwrecks: 29 October 1888
Ship	State	Description
Girdleness	United Kingdom	The steamship was severely damaged by fire at Burntisland, Fife.

== 31 October ==
List of shipwrecks: 31 October 1888
Ship	State	Description
Arthur	Netherlands	The ship departed from Doboy, Georgia, United States for Amsterdam, North Holland. No further trace, reported overdue.
A. W. Lawrence	United States	During a pre-dawn race with the tug Merrill (United States) in the harbor at Milwaukee, Wisconsin, the tug disintegrated when her boiler exploded, killing four of her six-man crew. The accident was blamed on her engineer suddenly turning on the water feed to her boiler while she was carrying a full head of steam. Her remains lie on the harbor bottom at 43°01.532′N 087°51.339′W.
Tony Krogmann	United Kingdom	The ship departed from Aruba, Curaçao and Dependencies for Gloucester. No further trace, reported missing.

== Unknown date ==
List of shipwrecks: Unknown date in October 1888
Ship	State	Description
Adela	Argentina	The steam lighter collided with the steam lighter Banco (United Kingdom) at San Pedro and was severely damaged.
Admiral	Russia	The steamship was driven ashore on Hogland.
Advance	Norway	The schooner ran aground on the Scroby Sands, Norfolk, United Kingdom. She was on a voyage from Laurvig to Bordeaux, Gironde, France. She was refloated with the assistance of a tug and assisted in to Great Yarmouth, Norfolk.
Algonquin	United Kingdom	The steamship was driven ashore in the DeTour Passage.
Amazonaz	United Kingdom	The steamship ran aground at "Raaso", Grand Duchy of Finland. She was later refloated and taken in to Oskarshamn, Sweden for repairs.
Anna Bertha, and Josephine	Germany; Russia	The barque Anna Berth and the schooner Josephine collided and were both severely damaged. Josephine was on a voyage from Cherbourg, Manche, France to Hanko, Grand Duchy of Finland. Both vessels were taken in to Helsingør, Denmark.
Anna Sophie	Denmark	The schooner ran aground on the Middelgrunden, in the Baltic Sea. She was on a voyage from Saint Petersburg, Russia to Landskrona, Sweden. She was refloated and resumed her voyage, but then collided with the schooner Solnar (Norway), also aground on the Middelgrunden.
Apotheker Diesling	Germany	The barque was wrecked at Salina, Brazil. Her crew were rescued.
Arctic	Sweden	The barque was driven ashore at Helsingborg. She was on a voyage from Luleå to Hull, Yorkshire, United Kingdom. She was refloated and taken in to Höganäs.
Astrolabe	France	The ship departed from "Awathoa", Japan. No further trace, presumed subsequently wrecked in the Vanikoro Islands.
Baltic	Sweden	The brig foundered in the North Sea. Her crew were rescued by the brig Treve (Flag unknown). Baltic was on a voyage from Bo'ness, Lothian, United Kingdom to a Danish port.
Bee	United Kingdom	The steamship sank at Carlingford, County Louth. She was on a voyage from Runcorn, Cheshire to Newry, County Antrim.
Berndina	Netherlands	The schooner was abandoned at sea. She was subsequently taken in to Copenhagen, Denmark.
Bertha Hela	Germany	The schooner was driven ashore and sank at Danzig.
Betty	Russia	The full-rigged ship was driven ashore at "Penisari". She was refloated and taken in to Karlskrona, Sweden.
Bjornen	Norway	The schooner collided with a British steamship off Trekroner, Zeeland, Denmark and was severely damaged. She put in to Copenhagen on 10 October.
Brazilian	Flag unknown	The barque was driven ashore at Sandviken, Öland, Sweden.
Brilliant	Norway	The barque ran aground on the Middelgrunden. She was on a voyage from Härnösand, Sweden to Marseille, Bouches-du-Rhône, France.
Cathinka	Denmark	The schooner was run down and sunk by the barque Hero (Norway). Her crew were rescued.
Ciscar	Spain	The steamship ran aground off Bradwell-on-Sea, Essex, United Kingdom.
City of Montreal	United Kingdom	The steamship was driven ashore and wrecked at Michipicoten, Ontario, Canada.
Commodore	United Kingdom	The ship was driven ashore at Mörbylånga, Öland. She was refloated in early November and taken in to Oskarshamn.
Draco	United Kingdom	The steamship was driven ashore at "Krage", Denmark. She was on a voyage from South Shields, County Durham to Riga, Russia. She was refloated with the assistance of a steamship and taken in to Fredrikshavn, Denmark.
Ealings	United Kingdom	The steamship ran aground at North Sydney, Nova Scotia, Canada. She was on a voyage from New Orleans, Louisiana, United States to Rouen, Seine-Inférieure, France.
Emelie Marie	France	The barque was towed in to Sundsvall, Sweden in a waterlogged condition.
Emu	United Kingdom	The tug was driven ashore and wrecked at Whitby, Yorkshire. Her crew were rescued by rocket apparatus.
Eos	Russia	The steamship was driven ashore at Allinge, Denmark. She was on a voyage from Reval to Aarhus, Denmark. She was refloated with the assistance of a steamship and taken in to Copenhagen.
E. S. Jobson	United Kingdom	The steamship was driven ashore on Anholt, Denmark. She was refloated.
Esperance	Sweden	The barque ran aground on the Middelgrunden. She was on a voyage from Sundsvall to Havre de Grâce, Seine-Inférieure. She was refloated with assistance and resumed her voyage.
Frogmore	United Kingdom	The steamship was driven ashore at Hasle, Bornholm, Denmark. She was on a voyage from Kiel, Germany to Riga. She was refloated in mid-November and assisted in to Copenhagen for repairs.
Gaboon	United Kingdom	The steamship was driven ashore near Southport, North Carolina. She was later refloated and taken in to Wilmington, North Carolina.
Gipsy Queen	United Kingdom	The steamship ran aground in the Elbe.
Graphic	United Kingdom	The steamship ran aground in the Danube 35 nautical miles (65 km) from its mouth.
Iris	Norway	The barque ran aground on the Middelgrunden. She was on a voyage from Söderhamn, Sweden to Calais, France.
Isaac	Russia	The schooner was driven ashore on the south coast of Amack, Denmark. She was refloated.
James Turpie	United Kingdom	The steamship collided with the steamship Kami (Greece) off Malta and was severely damaged. She was beached.
King Tofa	United Kingdom	The steamship was holed by her anchor and sank near Lagos.
Krona	Sweden	The barque was driven ashore at Näsby, Öland.
Laforte	France	The schooner collided with the steamship Whickham (United Kingdom) and sank 9 nautical miles (17 km) east of Europa Point, Gibraltar with the loss of her captain.
Liona	United Kingdom	The steamship ran aground in the River Ouse. She was then run into by the steamship Stadt Nieupoort (Belgium) and was severely damaged. Liona was on a voyage from Ghent, East Flanders, Belgium to Goole, Yorkshire.
Lippe	Belgium	The steamship ran aground in the Loire. She was on a voyage from Nantes, Loire-Inférieure, France to Antwerp.
Lisette	Sweden	The brig was driven ashore. She was on a voyage from Vestervig, Denmark to Moulmein, Burma. She was refloated and taken in to Varberg in a leaky condition.
Marsala	Germany	The steamship ran aground at Hamburg. She was on a voyage from New York to Hamburg.
Mary K. Campbell	United Kingdom	The barque was driven ashore at Matane, Quebec, Canada. She was on a voyage from New York, United States to Montreal, Quebec.
Merton	United Kingdom	The Thames barge collided with the steamship Rosella (United Kingdom) and sank in the Thames Estuary off Broadness Point.
Metz	Germany	The steamship ran aground on the Normand Sand, in the Baltic Sea.
M. M. Drake	United States	The steamship was driven ashore and wrecked in the Mackenzie Strait.
Nelson	United Kingdom	The steamship caught fire. The fire was extinguished and she put back to Sulina, Romania. She was subsequently taken in to Galaţi, Romania for repairs.
New Design	United Kingdom	The schooner was driven ashore at Bridgwater, Somerset.
Niagara	United Kingdom	The steamship ran aground at Hull. She was on a voyage from Bombay, India to Hull. She was refloated on 23 October and taken in to Hull.
Nicholaas	Netherlands	The full-rigged ship was driven ashore on "Rigchel", off Vlieland, Friesland. She was on a voyage from Harlingen, Friesland to Härnösand.
Niels	Denmark	The kuff collided with the barque Sarah B. Cann (United Kingdom) and was severely damaged. Niels was on a voyage from Danzig to Thisted. She was towed in to Helsingør in a waterlogged condition.
'Niobe	Austria-Hungary	The steamship was driven ashore 10 nautical miles (19 km) north of Constanţa, Romania.
Osmaury	France	The brig foundered in the North Sea off Terschelling, Friesland, Netherlands. Her crew were rescued by the barque India (Norway). Osmaury was on a voyage from Rouen to Malmö, Sweden.
Oxon	United Kingdom	The steamship ran aground at Dragør, Denmark. She was on a voyage from Skellefteå, Sweden to Hull. She was later refloated with assistance and taken in to Copenhagen.
Patria	Norway	The brig ran aground on the Lillegrund, in the Baltic Sea. She was refloated with assistance and taken in to Copenhagen.
Privateer	Canada	The barque ran aground on the Middelgrunden. She was on a voyage from Stettin, Germany to New York. She was refloated and resumed her voyage.
Rachel Lotinga	United Kingdom	The lighter sank in the River Tyne.
Rhodora	United Kingdom	The steamship was driven ashore at Alberoni, Italy.
Robert	Norway	The barque ran aground and was damaged at Stoksund. She was on a voyage from Arkhangelsk, Russia to Hull. She was refloated and towed in to Trondheim.
Robert	Denmark	The brigantine was driven ashore at "Serro", Russia before 24 October. She was refloated with assistance from the steamship Hero (Russia).
Sirius	Flag unknown	The ship ran aground near Onega, Russia. She was refloated and put in to the Pushbacka River. Repair was declared impossible.
Sir Robert Sale	United Kingdom	The ship was wrecked near Oran, Algeria. Her crew were rescued.
Smit	Netherlands	The steamship ran aground at Stevns, Denmark. She was on a voyage from Liepāja, Russia to London, United Kingdom. She was refloated with the assistance of a steamship and taken in to Copenhagen.
Solnar	Norway	The schooner ran aground on the Middelgrunden. She was then run into by the schooner Anna Sophie (Denmark). Solnar was on a voyage from Kemi, Grand Duchy of Finland to Grangemouth, Stirlingshire, United Kingdom. She was refloated and resumed her voyage.
Sowerby	United Kingdom	The steamship ran aground at Saltholmen, Denmark. She was on a voyage from Hartlepool, County Durham to Pillau, Germany. She was refloated with assistance and taken in to Copenhagen.
Speranza	Norway	The brig was abandoned in the North Sea. Her crew were rescued by the smack Great Carlton (United Kingdom). Speranza was on a voyage from Goole to Christiania.
Stanhope	United Kingdom	The steamship was driven ashore at Allinge, Denmark. She was on a voyage from Härnösand to Lisbon, Portugal. She was refloated with the assistance of a steamship and taken in to Copenhagen.
Star of Hope	United Kingdom	The smack was driven ashore 2 nautical miles (3.7 km) north of Winterton-on-Sea. Her crew were rescued.
Talavera	United Kingdom	The steamship was wrecked at Cape Finisterre, Spain.
Thyra	Sweden	The schooner ran aground on the Steilsand, in the North Sea off the coast of Germany. She was on a voyage from Greenock, Renfrewshire, United Kingdom to Danzig.
Venus	Germany	The brig was abandoned at sea. Her crew were rescued. She was on a voyage from Barranquilla, Colombia to Falmouth, Cornwall, United Kingdom.
Victoria	Spain	The steamship ran aground on the Salmedina Reef, off Chipiona.
Victoria	Norway	The barque was driven ashore on Baker's Island. She was refloated and taken in to Sydney, New South Wales.
Vixen	Norway	The brig was driven ashore at Strömstad, Sweden. She was on a voyage from Newcastle upon Tyne, Northumberland, United Kingdom to Christiania.
Voltaic	United Kingdom	The ship sank at Liverpool, Lancashire.
Four unnamed vessels	United Kingdom	The ships were driven ashore on Anholt.
