= DeTour Reef Light =

Lighthouse in Michigan, United States

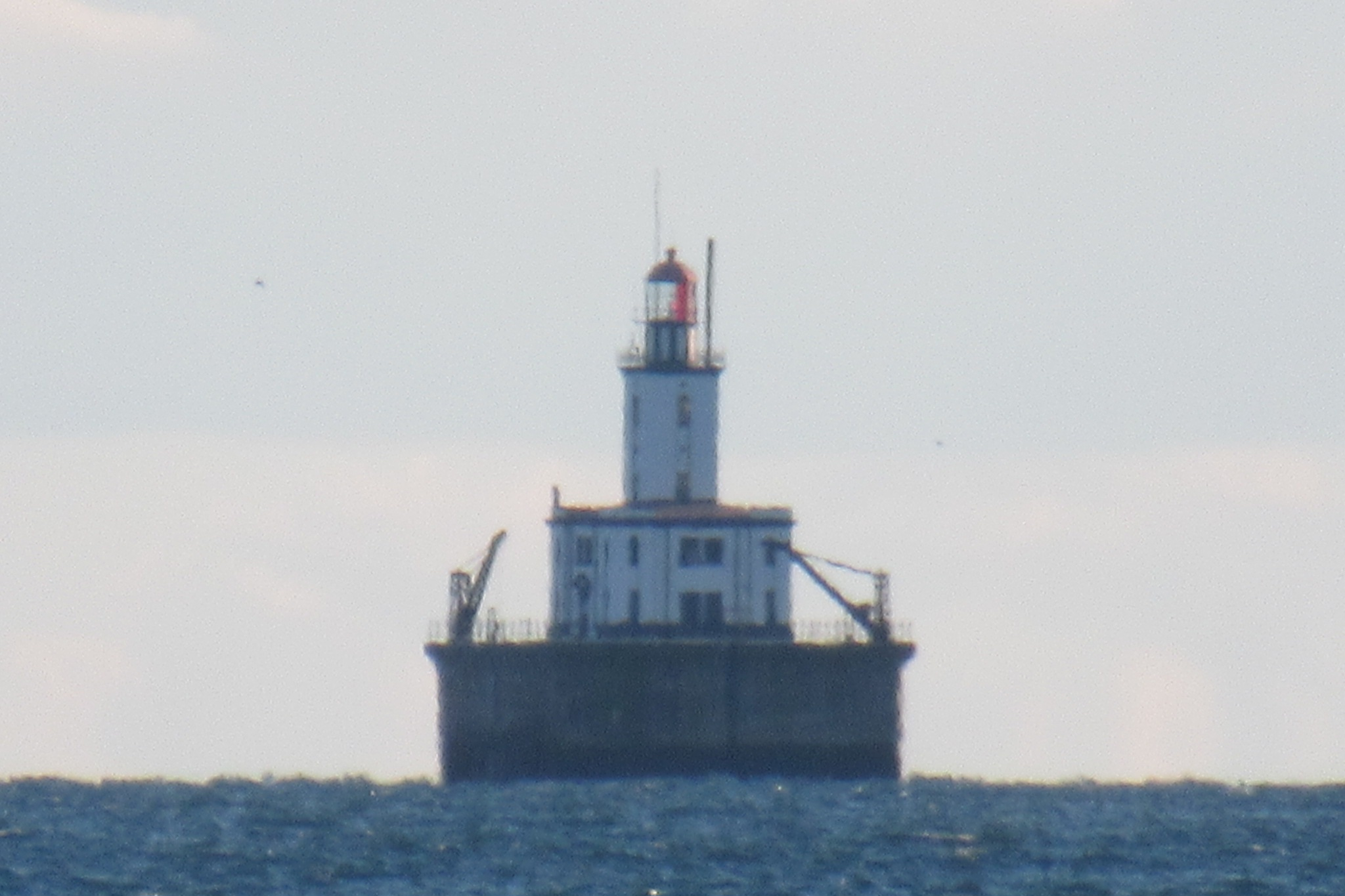
- Distant view from Drummond Island
- Location: Lake Huron, Michigan
- Coordinates: 45°56′56.12″N 83°54′10.98″W

Tower
- Foundation: Concrete Crib pier
- Construction: Reinforced concrete and steel
- Automated: 1974
- Height: Tower - 78 feet (24 m)
- Shape: Square tower, Integral White square superstructuredecahedron lantern
- Markings: White with black trim & red roof
- Heritage: National Register of Historic Places listed place, Michigan State Historic Site
- Fog signal: HORN: 2 every 60s
- Racon: "D" (Delta)(– • •)

Light
- First lit: 1931
- Focal height: 74 feet (23 m)
- Lens: third and one-half order Fresnel lens (1908–1978), VRB-25, fourth order Fresnel lens (1857–1870)
- Range: W 16 nautical miles; 29 kilometres (18 mi), R 15 miles (24 km)
- Characteristic: Fl W 10s (R sector) Red from 079.5° to 189.5°.
- DeTour Reef Light Station
- U.S. National Register of Historic Places
- Nearest city: DeTour Township, Michigan
- Area: 0.1 acres (0.040 ha)
- Architect: Office of Supt. of Lighthouses
- Architectural style: Classical Revival or Art Deco
- MPS: Light Stations of the United States MPS
- NRHP reference No.: 05000151
- Added to NRHP: March 15, 2005

The DeTour Reef Light is a non-profit-operated lighthouse marking the southern entrance of the DeTour Passage between the eastern end of Michigan's Upper Peninsula and Drummond Island. The light is an automated active aid to navigation. It marks the northern end of Lake Huron. The passage is used by almost all of the Great Lakes commercial freighter traffic moving to and from Lake Superior, with approximately 5,000 vessel movements annually. It is said to be "the gateway to Lake Superior." In addition, many recreational boaters use the passage. The Light is located in Lake Huron, three miles (5 km) south of the nearest town, DeTour Village, Michigan.

== Lighthouse history ==
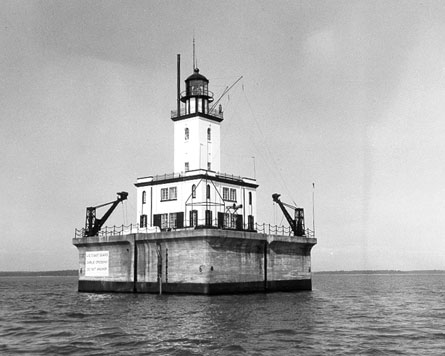
Historic image of the lighthouse

The southern entrance to DeTour Passage is made dangerous by a shoal, DeTour Reef. In order to enter or leave the passage, boats must thread past a shallow area no more than 23 feet (7.0 m) deep.

In 1847 a lighthouse was located on shore at Point DeTour, Michigan to protect the DeTour Passage at the northwestern end of Lake Huron. In 1931 it was moved offshore on to DeTour Reef. It is locally called the "Gateway to Superior”.

The DeTour Reef Lighthouse, raised in 1931, not only marks the channel, but also is built atop DeTour Reef on a crib structure, and warns boats away from it. The lighthouse and its concrete base are 83 feet (25 m) tall.

After commercial bids were determined to be unsatisfactory, the light was constructed by the U.S. Army Corps of Engineers. The structure was finished in 327 working days. This iteration of the light was built for $140,000. Some sources have described it as "Art Deco."

The concrete foundation is similar to the Martin Reef Light located about 10 miles (16 km) to the west, and Poe Reef Light located near Cheboygan, Michigan. The same crew built all three lights around the same time. It is almost a 'fraternal twin' of the Fourteen Foot Shoal Light which was built in 1930. In that sense, by using the same crews, equipment and personnel, the builders followed in the tradition of the builders of Spectacle Reef Light, White Shoal Light, and Waugoshance Light, thereby achieving real savings and efficiency.

This light (and its predecessor) have gone through many different lenses in its 160-year history.

- In 1848, the original illuminating apparatus was a fixed white light produced by 13 Argand lamps—the predecessor and original design of the so-called "Lewis lamp"—each with a 14-inch (360 mm) reflector. It was designed with a 270-degree arc to conserve whale oil.
- In 1857 a 4th order Fresnel lens producing a fixed white light was installed.
- In 1870 a fixed, white, 3rd order Fresnel lens was installed. That year, the remnants of the original stone tower were removed. In 1907, the 3rd order lens was replaced by a 3½-order bi-valve lens. This lens did not last long.
- In 1908 a rare 3½-order Order Fresnel lens, one of only a dozen used around the country, most of which were on the Great Lakes, configured as a flashing white light with a characteristic of a one-second flash and a nine-second eclipse was installed. It had an effective range of 30 miles (48 km). The lens was manufactured by Barbier, Benard & Turenne Co. of Paris, France. It has the number USLHE 317 stamped on it. These lights were typically reserved for places that were an especially serious hazard to navigation. See, for example, Sturgeon Point Light. Other Great Lakes lights that had 3½-order Fresnel lenses were at (in alphabetical order): Eagle Bluff, Grays Reef, Huron Island, Michigan Island, St. Helena Island, and Toledo Harbor.
- In 1931, a new Detour Reef light structure was introduced. The same lens was relocated to it, The light remained white.
- In 1936, the color changed from fixed white to white with a red sector that faced land. This was accomplished through the use of a color shade inside the lens room.
- In 1978 this lens was dismantled. It is now on display at the DeTour Passage Historical Museum in DeTour Village, Michigan.
- The present optic is a Vega VRB-25 system

A concise explanation on the different lenses and their technology is available at Lighthouse Illumination Technology, Terry Pepper, Seeing the Light.

This is part of a larger pattern of building 14 reef lights around Michigan, which was intended to help ships navigate through and around the shoals and hazards.

The station was equipped with a F-2-T diaphone fog signal, which was preserved at the Great Lakes Historical Society in Ohio. It has been returned to the custody of the lighthouse complex.

On April 30, 1909 the iron package freighter Russia foundered about 12 miles (19 km) off the lighthouse.

== Lighthouse privatization ==
In 1998, the National Trust for Historic Preservation named Michigan's historic lighthouses, with DeTour Reef Light being their prime example to their 1998 List of America's 11 Most Endangered Historic Places. This was the first time a lighthouse was included on the annual list. This gave impetus to the DeTour Reef Lighthouse Preservation Society, and lent them national recognition.

Like many U.S. lighthouses, in 1997 the DeTour Reef Lighthouse was "deemed excess" and no longer needed by its former owner, the United States Coast Guard. In response, in 1998, the DeTour Reef Light Preservation Society (DRLPS) was established as a nonprofit 501c3 volunteer organization to restore and preserve the DeTour Reef Light.

The Coast Guard transferred control and, finally, ownership over DeTour Reef Light to the DRLPS in a series of rolling steps. These steps tracked the successful DRLPS $1.2 million fundraising effort and demonstration that they could take on ownership of the Light:

- In 1998, the Coast Guard transferred custodianship responsibilities for the light to the DRLPS. The DRLPS began to renovate the Light.
- In 2000 DRLPS obtained a 20-year lease on the lighthouse from the Coast Guard.
- Also in 2000, Congress passed the National Historic Lighthouse Preservation Act of 2000, enabling the complete privatization of eligible light stations and light complexes. The DeTour Reef Light Preservation Society continued their renovation, and submitted an application to take over complete ownership of the lighthouse.
- In 2004, the DRLPS completed a major restoration with private donations from the general public, aided by funding from federal, state, and private grant entities.
- In 2005, in response to the success of this renovation effort, the DRLPS was awarded ownership of the DeTour Reef Light.

The DeTour Reef Lighthouse was added to the National Register of Historic Places in March 2005 under the title of the "DeTour Reef Light Station" as NRHP listing #05000151.

Detour Reef Light is one of more than 150 past and present major "lights" (which are greater in number than "lighthouses"—which implies a keeper's quarters)—in Michigan. This is just one of the 40 lighthouses in Michigan which have been transferred to private ownership in the recent past.

== Getting there ==
As of 2009, "public tours of this unique historic offshore Michigan maritime monument are now being offered", for the first time in the 74-year history of the lighthouse.

The light is only accessible by boat. The DRLPS offers boat trips to, and tours of, the lighthouse. A significant fee is charged to help cover the operating costs of maintaining the lighthouse. Also offered to a relatively small number of contributors are a limited number of occupancy nights for guests to stay in the lightkeeper's quarters; the quarters are restored to their appearance in and around 1956 (its last year of full-time occupation before automation). Guests are expected to help show the Light, and to perform lightkeeping chores, as a condition of their occupancy.

On March 21, 2022, the underwater power cable to the lighthouse failed, prompting DRLPS to cancel all 2022 Keeper and Tour programs. Limited programs were restarted in 2023, with power being provided from a small, temporary generator. Plans are being developed for a more permanent solution.

== Lighthouse relics ==
The DeTour Reef Light's former 3½-order Fresnel lens, taken out of service in 1978, is displayed at the DeTour Passage Historical Museum in DeTour, Mich. The lighthouse's former diaphone foghorn has also been restored and reinstalled in the lighthouse. Complete with new air compressors and tanks, the diaphone is in full working condition and is sounded periodically.

== See also ==
- Lighthouses in the United States

== Specialized Further reading ==
- Johnson, Cynthia (January 1999) Saving the DeTour Reef Lighthouse It Takes a Village, Lighthouse Digest.
- LaFave, Michael (Mackinac Center), Privatization Shines - article on the general subject of privatization of lighthouses, with a large section specifically on Granite Island.
- Passages, Official Magazine of the Detour Reef Light Preservation Society, all back issues on line.
- Wobser, David, Detour Reef Light -- Gateway to Lake Superior: A Textbook Example of Lighthouse Restoration, which originally appeared in the Summer 2003 issue of Great Laker magazine, Boatnerd.com.
