= Georgian Bay Land Trust =

The Georgian Bay Land Trust is a registered charity dedicated to protecting wilderness lands along eastern Georgian Bay and the North Channel, through strategic conservation planning, land securement, stewardship, research, and education. The Land Trust currently protects 64 ecologically significant properties stretching from Port Severn to the North Channel, totaling over 7,500 acres.

The Georgian Bay Land Trust’s properties protect a range of wetlands, forests, rock barrens, and islands, which provide key habitat for 50 species at risk. They also provide sites for scientific studies in collaboration with universities and fellow conservation organizations, including the Motus Wildlife Tracking System (used to study migratory birds and insects), at-risk snake and bat monitoring, and more.

The Georgian Bay Land Trust’s public-access properties provide recreational opportunities for communities and host educational events for all ages.

== Georgian Bay Land Trust in the news ==
- Solo kayaker plans to circumnavigate the Bay to raise funds for the Georgian Bay Land Trust. Retrieved on October 6, 2008
- Decades-long journey culminates in preservation of Sandy Island. Retrieved on October 6, 2008
