= 2014 Manitoulin District municipal elections =

Elections were held in the organized municipalities in the Manitoulin District of Ontario on October 27, 2014, in conjunction with municipal elections across the province.

== Assiginack ==
Reeve Candidate	Vote	%
Paul Moffatt	Acclaimed	

== Billings ==
Mayoral Candidate	Vote	%
Austin Hunt (X)	326	49.77
Sandi Hurcomb	205	31.30
David Yurich	123	18.93

== Burpee and Mills ==
Reeve Candidate	Vote	%
Ken Noland (X)	Acclaimed	

== Central Manitoulin ==
Mayoral Candidate	Vote	%
Richard Stephens	732	50.55
Gerry Strong (X)	716	49.45

== Cockburn Island ==
Reeve Candidate	Vote	%
Brenda Jones	Acclaimed	

== Gordon/Barrie Island ==
Reeve Candidate	Vote	%
Lee Hayden	221	61.05
Barbara Barfoot	141	38.95

== Gore Bay ==
Mayoral Candidate	Vote	%
Ron Lane (X)	Acclaimed	

== Northeastern Manitoulin and the Islands ==
Mayoral Candidate	Vote	%
Alan MacNevin (X)	Acclaimed	

== Tehkummah ==
Reeve Candidate	Vote	%
Eric Russell	153	56.46
Gary Brown (X)	118	43.54
