= Mississagi Strait =

Strait in lake Huron, Canada

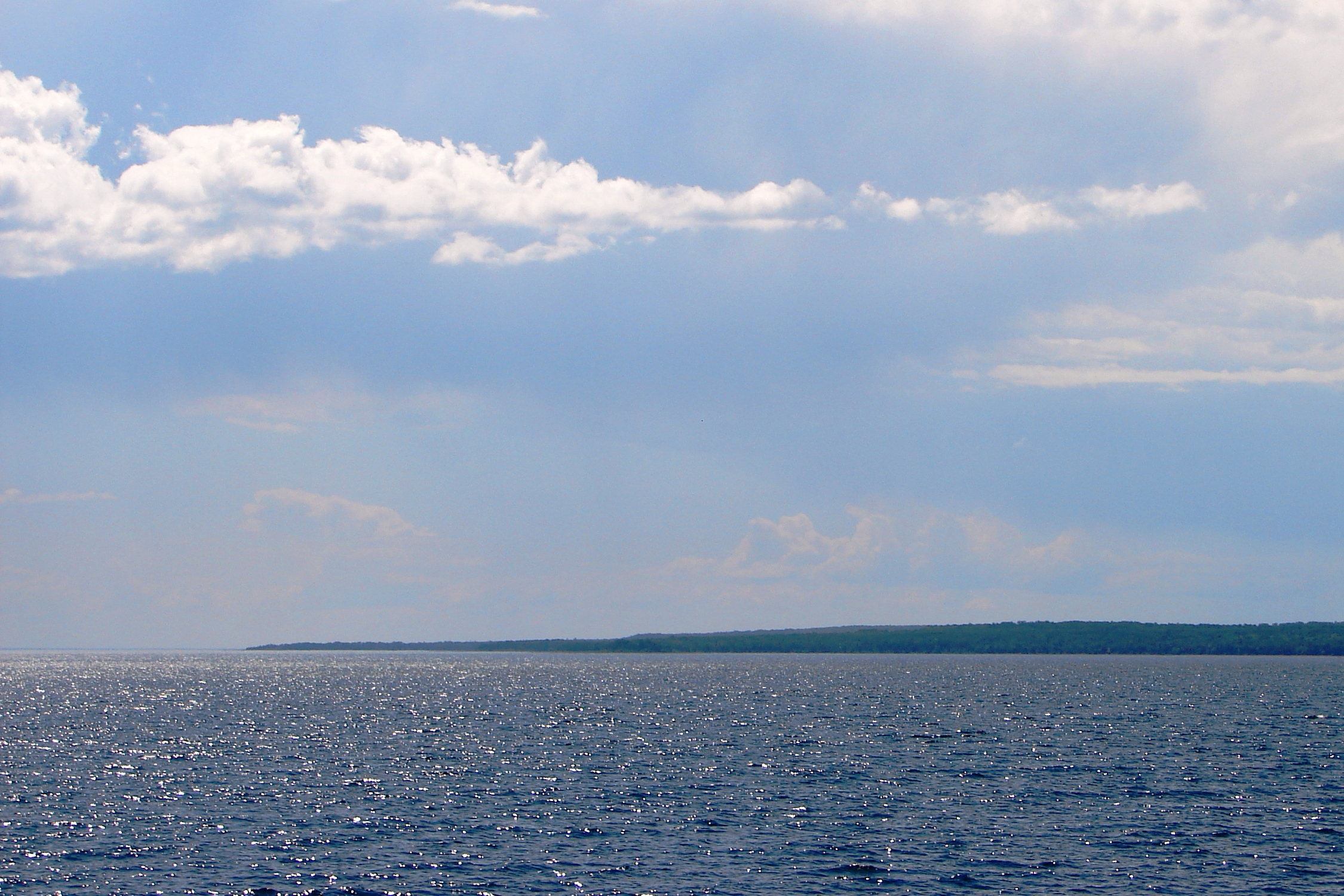
- Mississagi Strait with Cockburn Island in distance

- Location of the Mississagi Strait in Ontario
- Location: Manitoulin District, Ontario
- Coordinates: 45°55′51″N 83°14′14″W
- Part of: Lake Huron
- Basin countries: Canada
- Surface elevation: 176 m (577 ft)

The Mississagi Strait is a narrow strait or channel in Manitoulin District, Ontario, Canada, located in Lake Huron. It connects the North Channel to the main water body, and also separates Manitoulin Island to the east from Cockburn Island to the west.

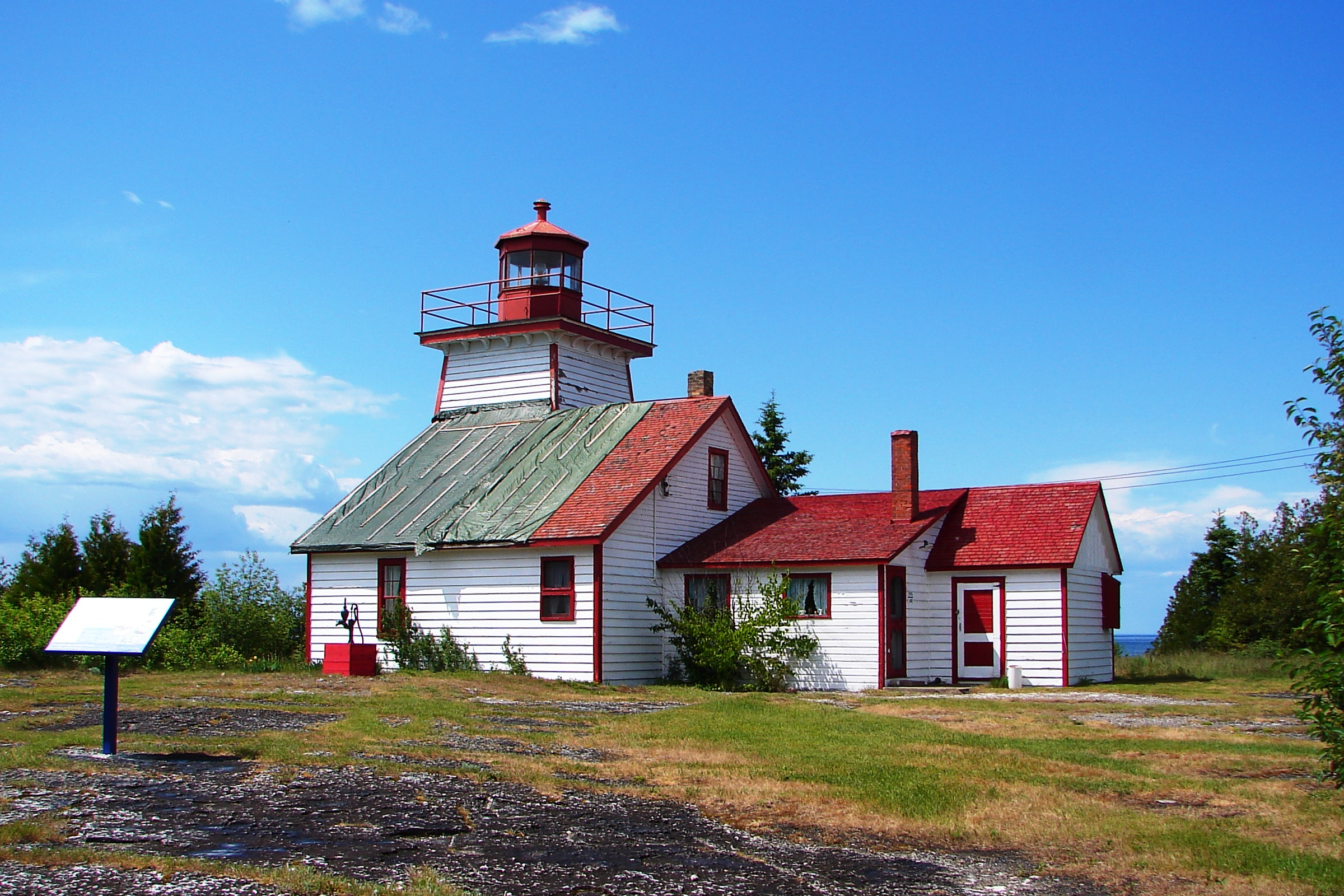
Mississagi Strait Lighthouse
