= False Detour Channel =

Coordinates: 45°57′35″N 83°27′20″W

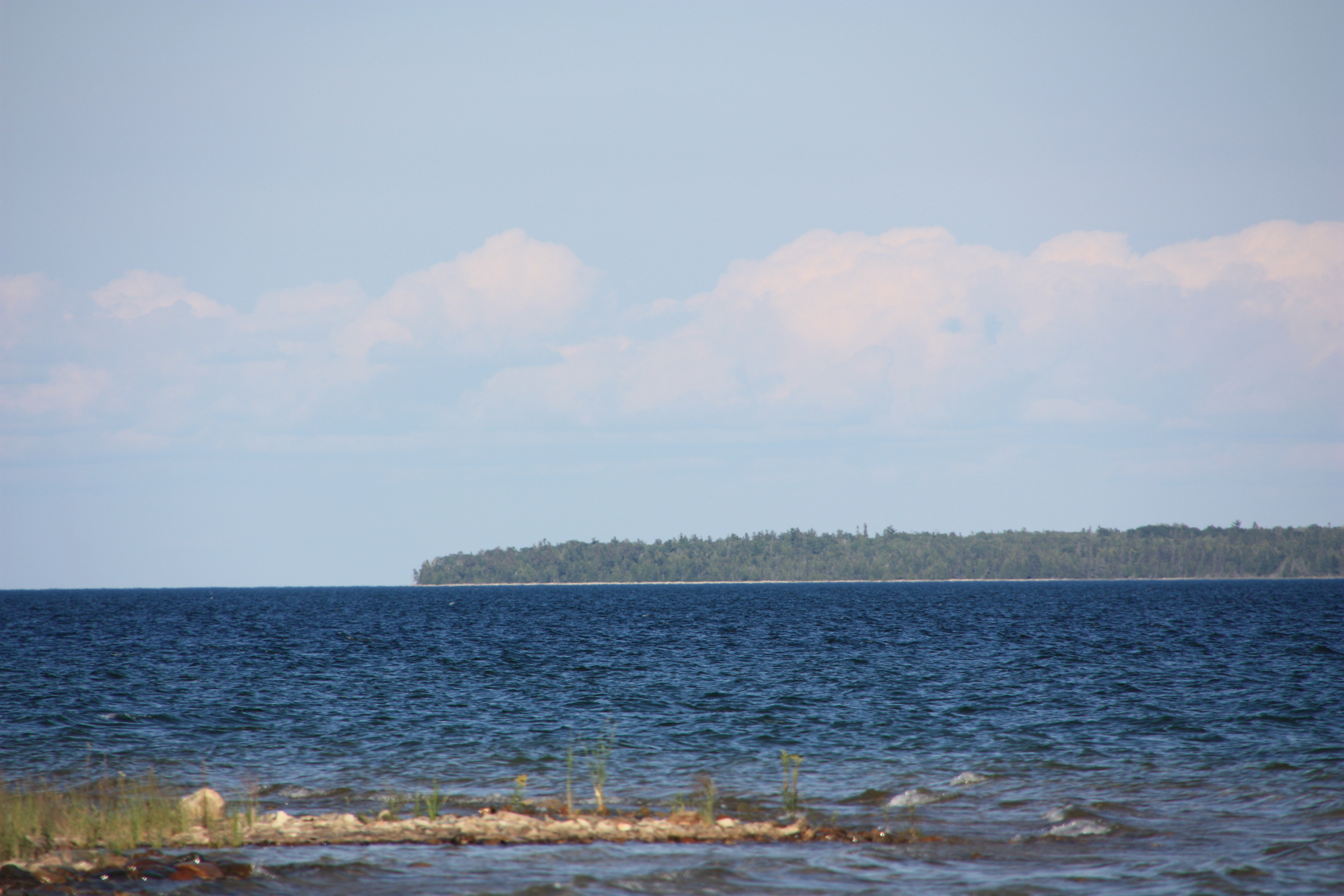
The False Detour Channel separates Cockburn Island (background) from Drummond Island (foreground).

The False Detour Channel is a short channel in Lake Huron, connecting the main body of the lake to the North Channel. The name comes from the French de tour (DeTour), and the waterways around Drummond Island, that early navigators found difficult to separate. The Canada–United States border passes roughly through the middle of the channel, which separates Michigan's Drummond Island (Chippewa County) from Ontario's Cockburn Island (Manitoulin District).
