= Eastern Upper Peninsula Transportation Authority =

Ferry and bus operator in the Upper Peninsula of Michigan, USA

- ferry/water interchange Bus interchange
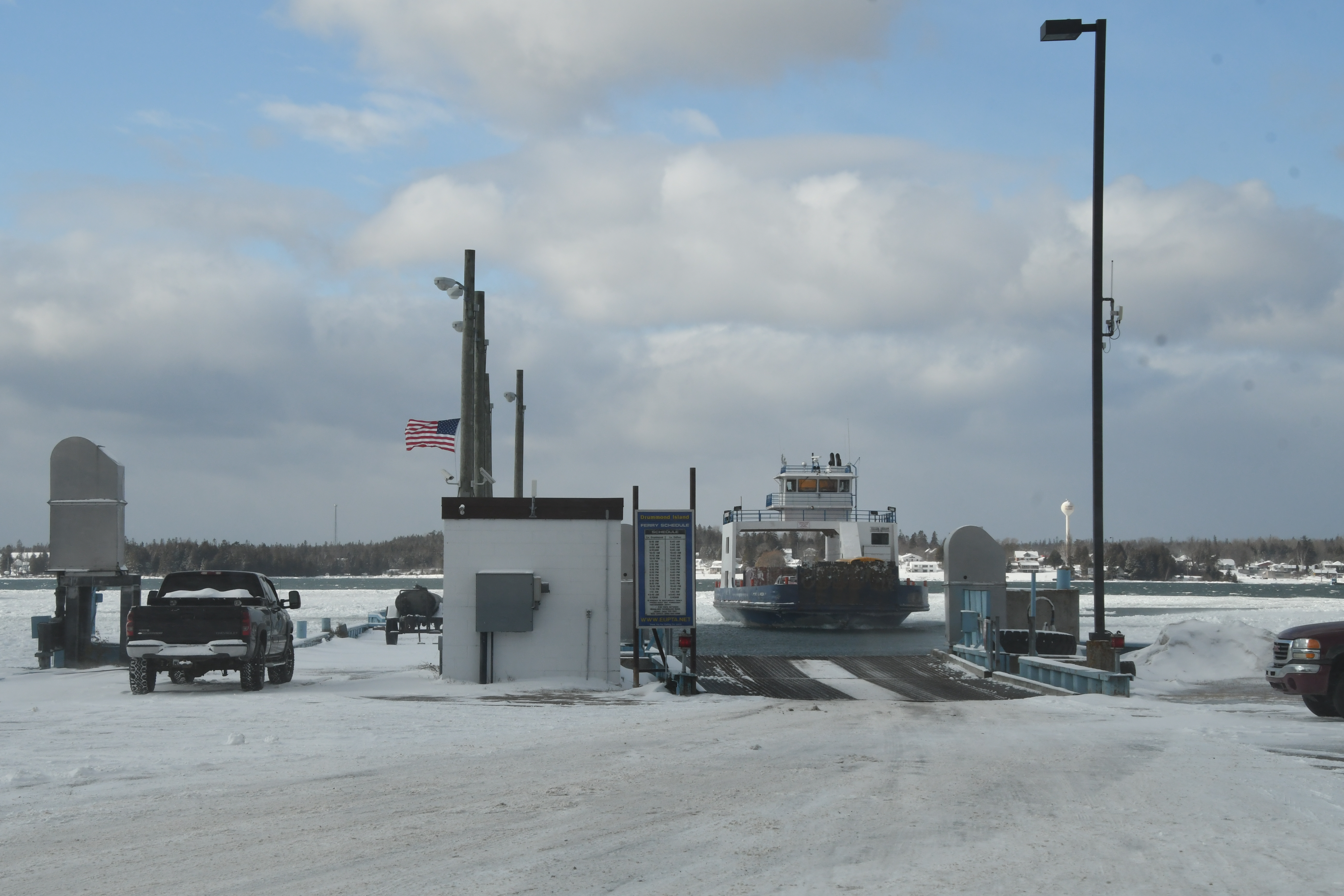
- Ferry terminal on Drummond Island
- Locale: Chippewa and Luce counties, Michigan
- Waterway: St. Marys River
- Transit type: Ferry; Bus
- Began operation: 1975
- Website: eupta.net

The Eastern Upper Peninsula Transportation Authority (EUPTA) is the operator of ferry and bus services in Chippewa and Luce counties, in the Upper Peninsula of Michigan. The EUPTA ferry system connects Drummond, Neebish, and Sugar islands to the Upper Peninsula mainland, using a fleet of four vessels. EUPTA's bus operations include a scheduled route between Sault Ste. Marie and Kincheloe, and a dial-a-ride service in Newberry.

== Ferry operations ==
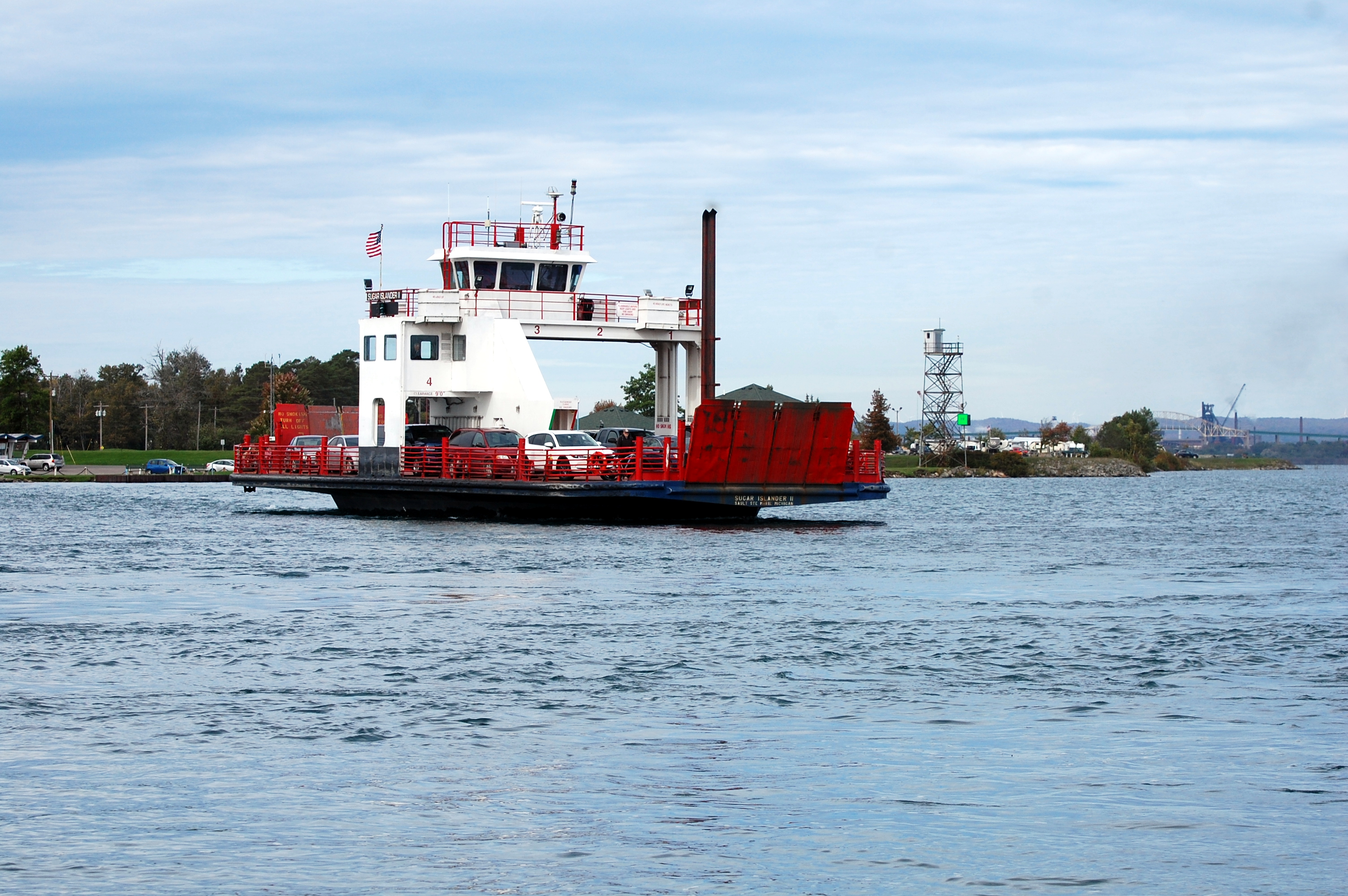
Sugar Islander II, the EUPTA's current vessel serving the Sugar Island route

EUPTA operates three ferry routes: DeTour Village–Drummond Island, Barbeau–Neebish Island, and Sault Ste. Marie–Sugar Island. As of 2023, the authority operates three vessels in its baseline service: the Sugar Islander II, the Drummond Islander IV, and the Neebish Islander III. The authority also operates the Drummond Islander III as a reserve vessel.

The three ferry routes serve tourism, island residents, and industry. The Drummond Island and Sugar Island routes serve the logging industries on their respective islands, and all three ferry routes provide additional unscheduled runs during the peak summer tourist season to accommodate demand.

== Bus operations ==
EUPTA operates bus services in Chippewa and Luce counties, with a scheduled service between Sault Ste. Marie and Kincheloe, and dial-a-ride service in Newberry and its surroundings. The authority does not operate local bus services within the city of Sault Ste. Marie, which are operated by the Chippewa Luce Mackinac Community Action Agency.

== History ==
EUPTA was founded in 1975 to operate the Drummond Island ferry service, and took over the Sugar Island and Neebish Island services five years later. The authority began operating dial-a-ride bus services in Luce, Mackinac, and Chippewa counties shortly after its inception, initially as a federally-funded demonstration program. EUPTA operated the Chippewa County International Airport from 1977 to 1987, when its airport operations were assumed by the Chippewa County Economic Development Corporation.
