= De Tour Passage Underwater Preserve =

Protected area in Michigan, United States

DeTour Passage Underwater Preserve
- Location within Michigan
- Location: Lake Huron, Chippewa County, Michigan USA
- Nearest city: De Tour Village, Michigan
- Coordinates: 45.985°N 83.895°W
- Governing body: Michigan Department of Natural Resources

The DeTour Passage Underwater Preserve is a preservation area in the U.S. state of Michigan. Located in Lake Huron, it completely surrounds Drummond Island and includes all of DeTour Passage and adjacent sections of Lake Huron and the St. Mary's River.

== History ==
With the discovery of significant hematite mines in northern Minnesota in the late 19th century, and the construction of steel mills from the late 19th century onward in and around Cleveland, Ohio, Detroit, Michigan, and Gary, Indiana, the DeTour Passage became an essential element in one of the most significant commodity supply pipelines of the Great Lakes.

The DeTour Passage carries almost all of the commercial water traffic that is entering or leaving Lake Superior. In addition, quarries on Drummond Island are a rich source of commercial dolomite, limestone, and aggregates, and many vessels have called upon Drummond Island to pick up stone cargoes. For these reasons, the DeTour Passage Underwater Preserve is exceptionally rich in Lake freighter wrecks of all kinds. The shipping losses in or near the Passage are due to storms, heavy seas and navigation.

The shallow waters make it easy for divers doing such wreck diving activities for the remains of lost ships.

A historic lighthouse, the DeTour Reef Light, today protects continuing freight traffic through this waterway.

== See also ==
- False Detour Channel
