= Cockburn Island (Ontario) =

- Township municipality (single-tier)
- Township of Cockburn Island
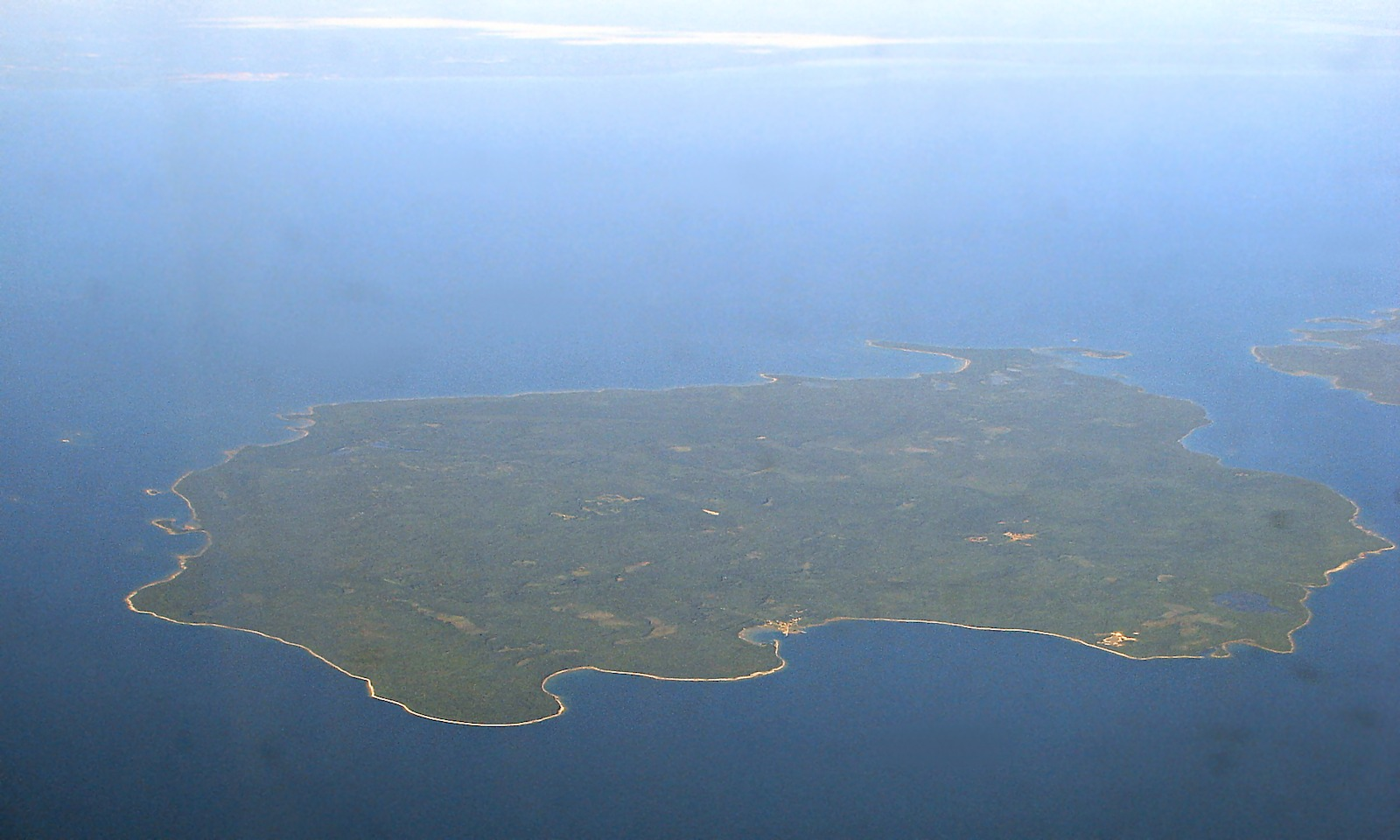
- Aerial view of Cockburn Island

- Location within Manitoulin District Location within Ontario
- Coordinates: 45°55′14″N 83°22′25″W
- Country: Canada
- Province: Ontario
- Region: Northeastern Ontario
- District: Manitoulin
- Settled: ca. 1880
- Incorporated: 1881

Government
  - Reeve: Brenda Jones
  - Federal riding: Sudbury East—Manitoulin—Nickel Belt
  - Prov. riding: Algoma—Manitoulin

Area
  - Land: 168.90 km^{2} (65.21 sq mi)

Population (2021)
  - Total: 16
  - Density: 0.1/km^{2} (0.26/sq mi)
- Time zone: UTC-5 (EST)
  - Summer (DST): UTC-4 (EDT)
- Postal Code FSA: P0P
- Area codes: 705, 249
- Website: cockburnisland.ca

Cockburn Island is an island and township municipality in the Canadian province of Ontario, located in the Manitoulin District. It is separated from the westernmost point of Manitoulin Island by the Mississagi Strait, and from Michigan's Drummond Island by the False Detour Channel. The island is incorporated as and coterminous with the municipal Township of Cockburn Island.

The island contains approximately 90 cottages that are owned and occupied by families as vacation properties, and thus has an estimated population of 200 to 300 people in the summer; however, the island's sole permanent year-round resident is a maintenance employee of the township, and thus its official census population has sometimes been recorded as zero due to Statistics Canada practices of rounding off the populations of communities smaller than 15 people. Historically, however, the island had a permanent resident population of up to 1,000 people, and evolved from a conventionally populated settlement into a seasonal cottage country area after the island's regular ferry service was discontinued in the 1960s.

== History ==
Sources are in conflict as to whether the island was named for Francis Cockburn, a deputy quartermaster of Upper and Lower Canada in the early 19th century, or for Isaac Cockburn, a descendant of his who was the island's first major landowner.

The first settlement on the island comprised a small number of family farms in the area known as Scotch Block, and the community of Tolsmaville was established in 1878 by Siberon "Zeke" Tolsma, a fisherman from Cheboygan, Michigan. A steamboat ferry service, linking the islands of the Manitoulin chain to Sault Ste. Marie and Southampton, was launched by 1879, the township government was incorporated in 1881, and an improved shipping dock was built in 1888.

Schools were built at Tolsmaville in 1882, and at Scotch Block in 1884.

After a change in provincial law in 1898, which banned the export of raw logs from the province and instead required local processing of the logs into lumber, the island saw a rapid expansion of its logging industry with the establishment of new sawmills; in addition to Tolsmaville, logging operations were also established in the new community of Ricketts Harbour.

The island reached a population peak of around 1,000 residents in the World War II era.

After the discontinuation of the MS Norgoma's run from Sault Ste. Marie to Owen Sound in the 1960s, Cockburn's transportation access was limited to a once-weekly ferry to Meldrum Bay on Manitoulin Island, and its population began to decline rapidly due to its increased isolation. Harold McQuarry, the former operator of the island's general store, stepped in at this time as the township's new reeve, and his efforts have been credited with the island's survival as a summer recreational community.

By the 1980s, the island's only full-time residents were Lee Chappell, a maintenance employee of the island's municipal government, and his wife Lynne. Chappell retired from his role in 2000 and was succeeded by Darren Rogers, who also lived on-island as of 2014; Chappell moved to Thessalon in 2009 after remarrying following Lynne's death.

Tolsmaville continues to serve as the hub of the island's summer tourist economy, even though some references incorrectly describe it as a wholly abandoned ghost town. Community events include an annual fish fry in August, and a community potluck on Labour Day weekend.

In addition to the family-owned residences, the island is also a popular camping destination. A modest logging industry continues to operate on the island, and a significant portion of the island is maintained by the Nature Conservancy of Canada as a conservation area.

A small portion (3.44 square kilometres (1.33 sq mi)) of the north-west side of the island is the Zhiibaahaasing 19 Indian reserve of the Zhiibaahaasing First Nation. On January 2, 2010, it was dissolved and added to Cockburn Island Township for census purposes. However, the reserve land itself is still set aside for the Zhiibaahaasing First Nation.

== Demographics ==
In the 2021 Census of Population conducted by Statistics Canada, Cockburn Island had a population of 16 living in 11 of its 89 total private dwellings, a change of inf% from its 2016 population of 0. With a land area of 168.9 km^{2} (65.2 sq mi), it had a population density of 0.1/km^{2} (0.2/sq mi) in 2021.

Canada census – Cockburn Island community profile

	2021	2016	2011
Population	16 (n/a% from 2016)	0 (0% from 2011)	0 (-100% from 2006)
Land area	168.90 km^{2} (65.21 sq mi)	171.04 km^{2} (66.04 sq mi)	171.04 km^{2} (66.04 sq mi)
Population density	0.1/km^{2} (0.26/sq mi)	0/km^{2} (0/sq mi)	0/km^{2} (0/sq mi)
Median age
Private dwellings	89 (total) 11 (occupied)	86 (total)	79 (total)
Median household income	$n/a

References: 2021 2016 2011

Historical census populations – Cockburn Island Township

Year	Pop.	±%
1881	245	—
1891	240	−2.0%
1901	301	+25.4%
1911	319	+6.0%
1921	193	−39.5%
1931	213	+10.4%
1941	210	−1.4%
1951	82	−61.0%

Year	Pop.	±%
1956	59	−28.0%
1961	66	+11.9%
1966	6	−90.9%
1971	0	−100.0%
1976	5	—
1981	4	−20.0%
1986	14	+250.0%
1991	0	−100.0%

Year	Pop.	±%
1996	2	—
2001	0	−100.0%
2006	10	—
2011	0	−100.0%
2016	0	0.00%
2021	16	—

Source: Statistics Canada

== Government ==
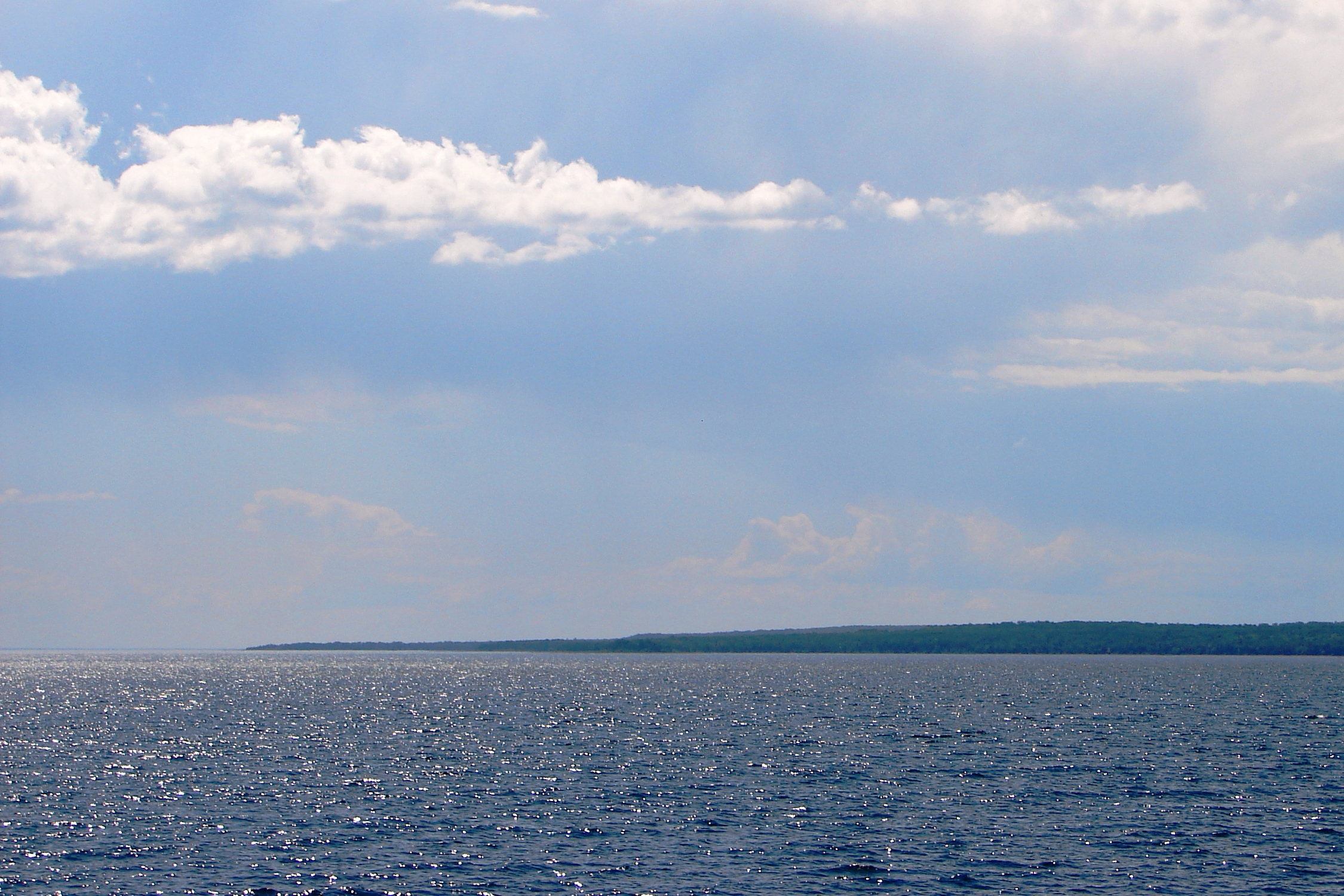
Cockburn Island as seen across Mississagi Strait.

The township's current reeve is Brenda Jones, who succeeded David Haight in the 2014 Manitoulin District municipal elections.

Due to the island's lack of a year-round resident population, the township offices are located on the mainland in Thessalon in Algoma District, although its historic on-island township hall is maintained as a community facility. Due to the seasonal nature of the municipality, however, the municipal government has few expenses beyond the maintenance of municipal facilities, the cost of postage for municipal mailers to its property owners, and a community telephone at the marina facility.

Its status as an incorporated municipality also enables it to receive federal and provincial government funding for major municipal projects, such as maintenance and repair of municipal facilities and the construction of a transmission tower for mobile phone service. In addition to its full-time maintenance employee, the municipal government also regularly hires additional summer employees to assist in maintenance work during the height of tourist season.

Despite the lack of a permanent resident population, the municipality also maintains the township's historic buildings, including a school and a church.

== Transportation ==
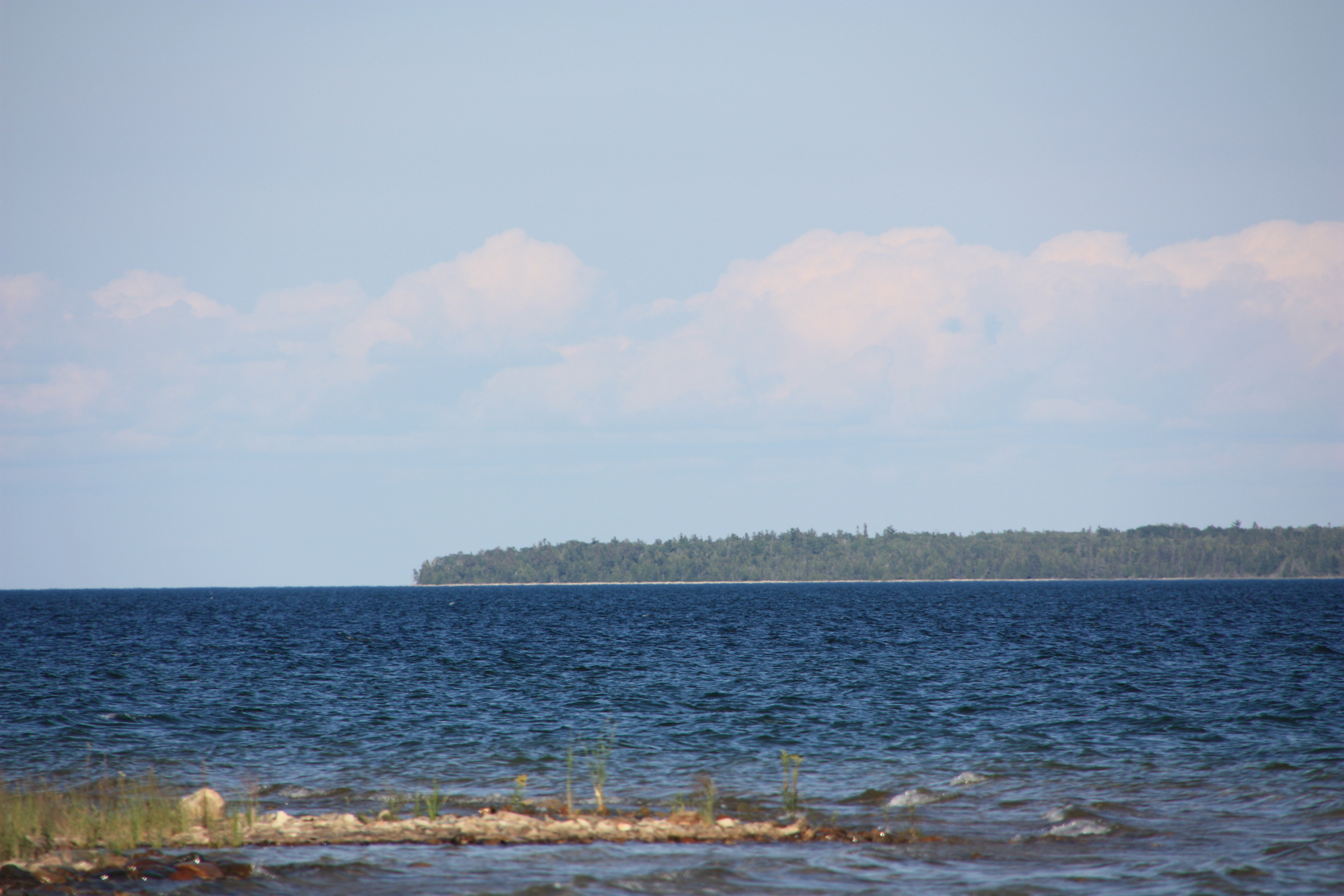
The northwestern shore of Cockburn Island as seen from Drummond Island, across the False Detour Channel.

The island is not currently connected to either Manitoulin or Drummond Islands, or to the mainland, by bridge or ferry service; its only transportation access is across the water by private boat in summer or snowmobile in the winter, or air travel in a float plane or a helicopter. The municipality maintains a marina at Tolsmaville, and a small grass airstrip located west of Tolsmaville provides a landing area for air travel.

In the early 2020s, the township undertook a project to realign a road near Tolsmaville for public safety, retaining rock for a future project to repair the breakwater protecting the marina.

== See also ==
- List of townships in Ontario
