= Drummond Township, Michigan =

Drummond Township, Michigan Drummond Island
- Civil township
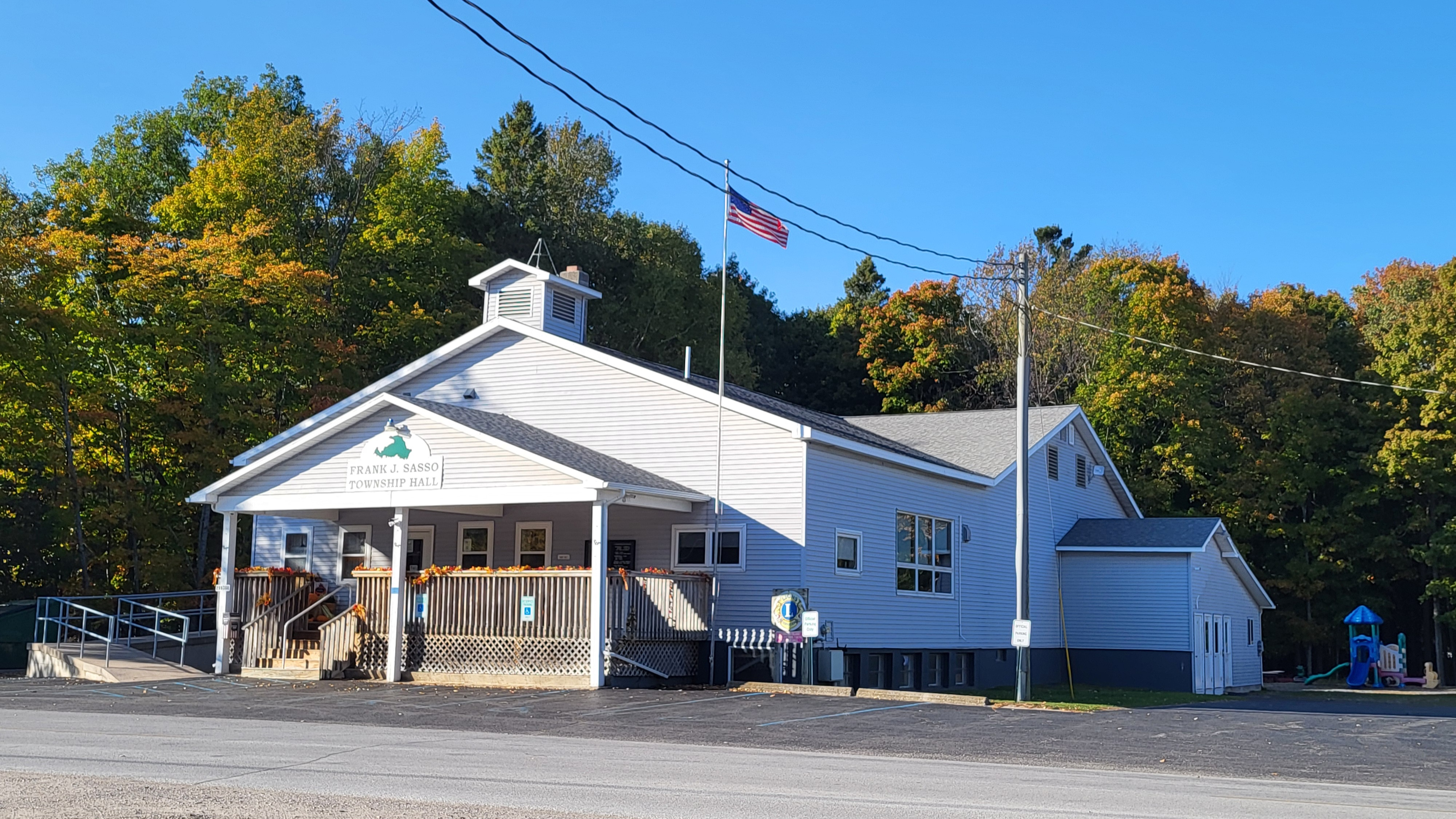
- Frank J. Sasso Township Hall

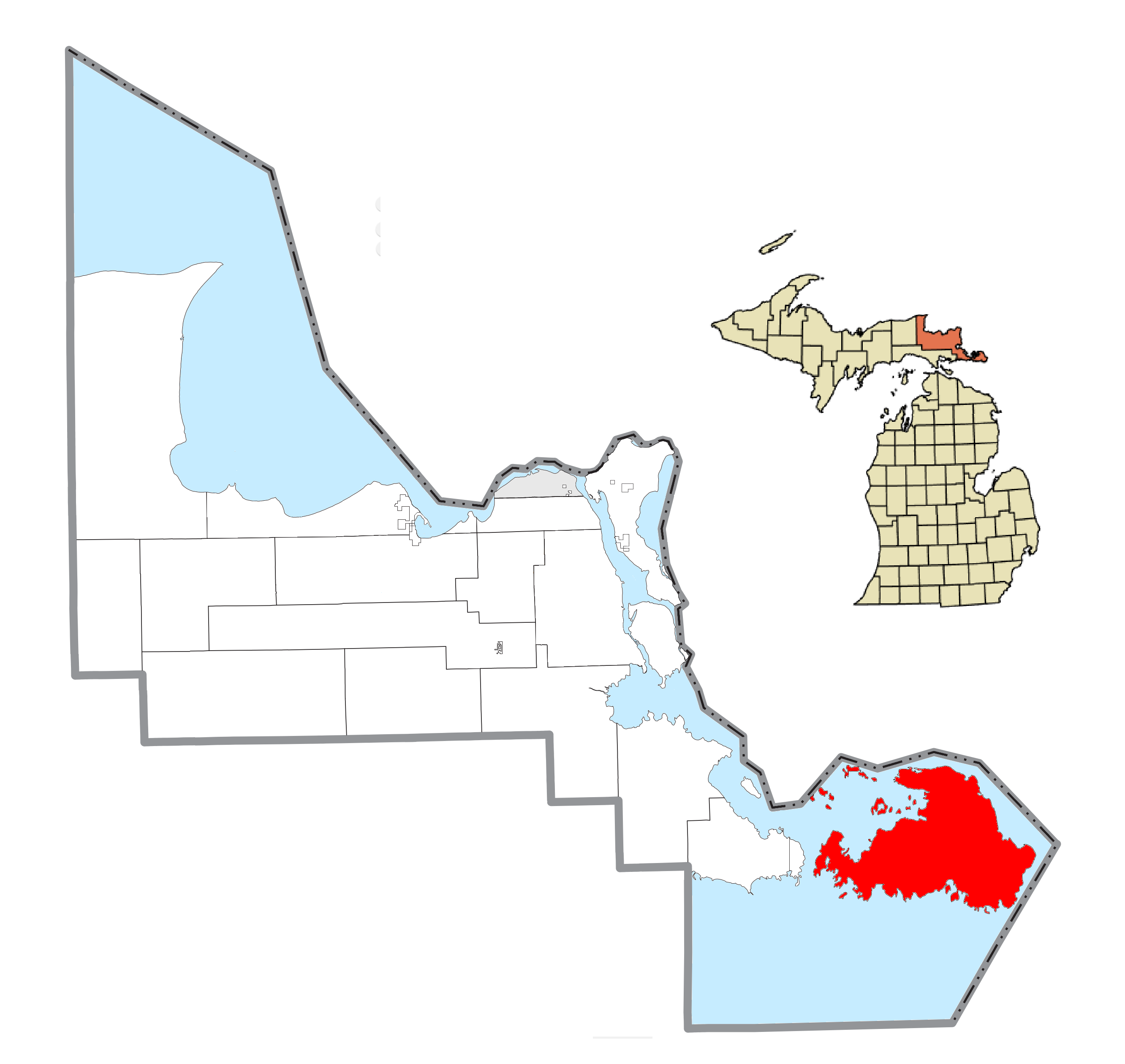
- Location within Chippewa County

- Location within the state of Michigan Location within the United States
- Coordinates: 46°00′00″N 83°40′00″W
- Country: United States
- State: Michigan
- County: Chippewa
- Established: 1888

Government
  - Supervisor: Chad Cameron
  - Clerk: Carolyn Havens

Area
  - Total: 248.99 sq mi (644.88 km^{2})
  - Land: 128.91 sq mi (333.88 km^{2})
  - Water: 20.09 sq mi (52.03 km^{2})
- Elevation: 810 ft (247 m)

Population (2020)
  - Total: 973
  - Density: 7.55/sq mi (2.92/km^{2})
- Time zone: UTC-5 (Eastern (EST))
  - Summer (DST): UTC-4 (EDT)
- ZIP code(s): 49726 (Drummond Island)
- Area code: 906
- FIPS code: 26-23080
- GNIS feature ID: 1626193
- Website: Official website

Drummond Township (/ˈdrʌmənd/ DRUH-mənd) is a civil township of Chippewa County in the U.S. state of Michigan. The population was 973 at the 2020 census.

The township encompasses the large Drummond Island and numerous smaller islands. Drummond Island is the seventh-largest lake island in the world. With an area of 134 sq mi (350 km^{2}), it is also the third-largest lake island in Lake Huron, behind Manitoulin and St. Joseph, and the fifth-largest island in the contiguous United States, behind Long Island, Padre Island, Isle Royale and Whidbey Island.

M-134 extends from the mainland to run through the western portion of the island, connecting with the mainland via the Drummond Island Ferry, which runs between the island and DeTour Village.

On the east side of Drummond Island, the Canada–United States border passes through the False Detour Channel. On the other side of that channel, the Canadian Cockburn Island separates Drummond from Manitoulin Island.

== Communities ==
- Drummond (or Drummond Island) is an unincorporated community on Potagannissing Bay on the northwest side of the island at 46°01′12″N 83°43′52″W. It was named after British commander Gordon Drummond, who built a fort here after the War of 1812. He abandoned the fort in 1822 when it was apparent that the island would become American territory. By the 1850s, the area was settled by Mormon missionaries and Native Americans. A post office in Drummond began operating on February 9, 1881. The post office was renamed Drummond Island on July 1, 1953. The Drummond Island 49726 ZIP Code serves the entirety of Drummond Township.
- Johnswood (also spelled as Johns Wood) is an unincorporated community on the southern coast of the island at 45°57′03″N 83°37′20″W. The community was settled around 1905 when the Kreetan Company from Tonawanda, New York took over the area sawmills. It was originally named Scammon's Cove after the small bay. A post office began operating under the name Kreetan on September 7, 1905. The post office was renamed Johns Wood when Harold Johnson became postmaster on March 19, 1914. The post office remained in operation until 1927.
- Lincoln is an unincorporated community near the center of Drummond Island at 45°58′26″N 83°39′23″W.
- Maxton is an unincorporated community located at 46°02′02″N 83°40′33″W. The community was established by the Cleveland Cedar Company in 1904 as a sawmill settlement along Potagannissing Bay a few miles northeast of Drummond. For the next three decades, several other sawmills began operating here. A post office in Maxton operated from 1904 until 1950.

== History ==
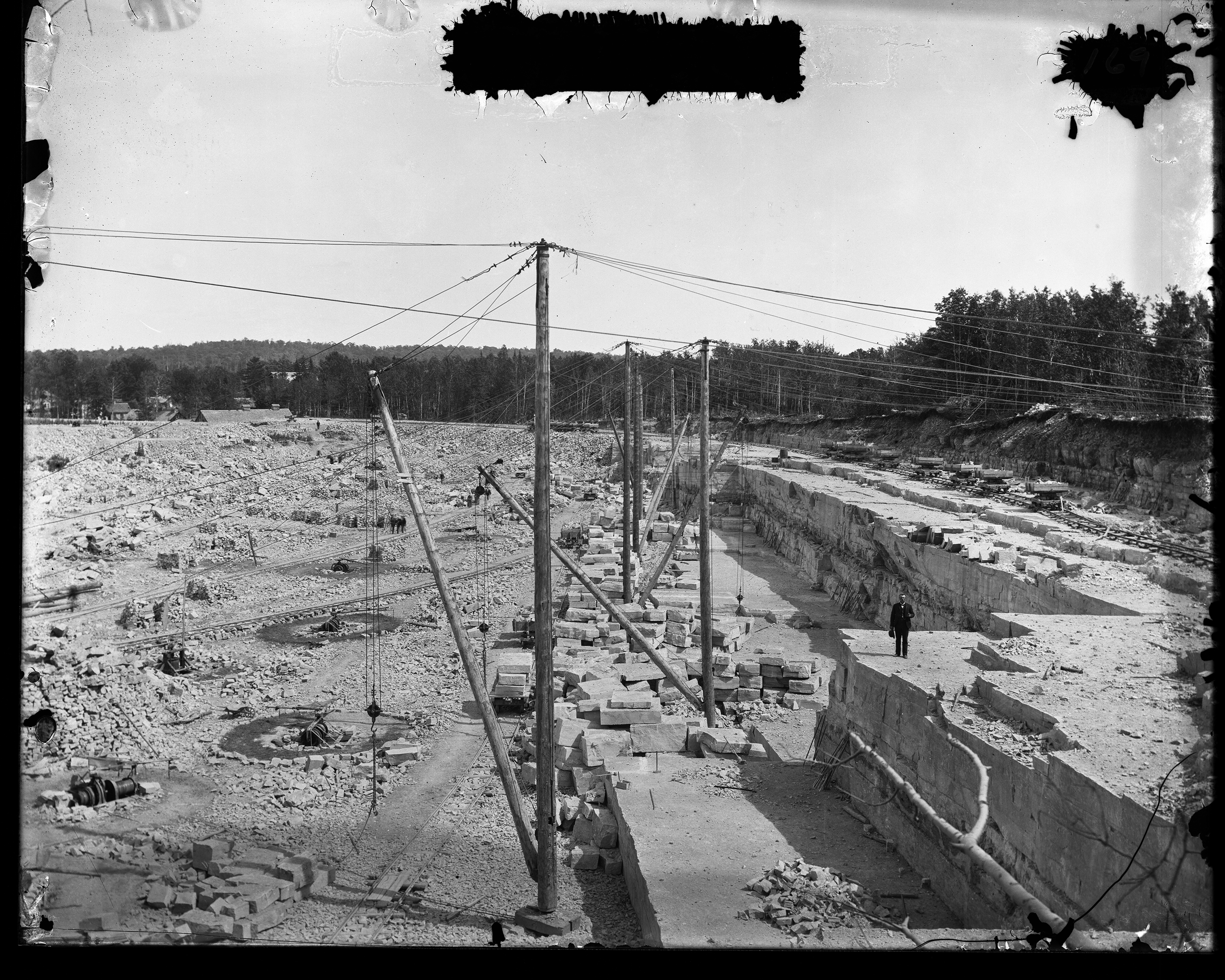
A quarry on Drummond Island (1893)

The township and island are named after Gordon Drummond, the first Canadian-born officer to command the military and the civil government of British Canada. As Lieutenant Governor of Upper Canada, Drummond distinguished himself on the Niagara front in the War of 1812 and later became Governor-General and Administrator of Canada. The Ojibwe name for the island is Bootaagan-minising (syncope as Bootaagan-mnising recorded as "Potagannissing"), meaning "at the Mill Island".

The history of Drummond Island dates back centuries, but more recent history of the past 200 years relates to the British occupation of the island during and after the War of 1812. The island was the last British outpost on American soil following the Treaty of Ghent (1814). On October 6, 1828, orders were sent out from Quebec that the post would be handed over, and the island was officially occupied by United States on November 14, 1828. Drummond Island was originally recorded by Americans as First Manitoulin Island and Drummond's Island.

=== Border on the Great Lakes ===
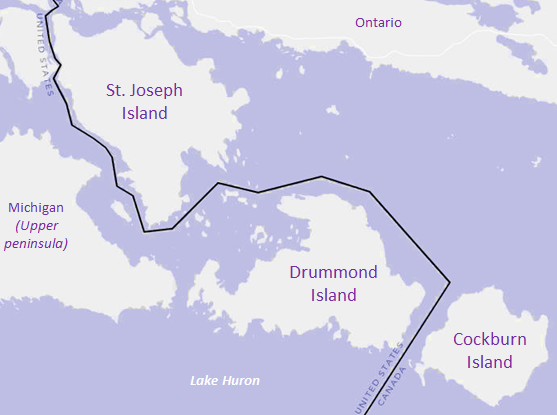
St. Joseph, Drummond, and Cockburn islands with the placement of the international boundary agreed to in 1822 and 1842

British and American negotiators to the 1814 Treaty of Ghent ended the War of 1812 by offering no territorial concessions to either side, but returned to those boundaries set by the Treaty of Paris of 1783. To resolve territorial claims that had precipitated the war, negotiators at Ghent established a process whereby commissioners would survey the boundary to determine the borders envisioned in the original treaty.

Beginning in August 1820, two teams of surveyors, including British explorer and cartographer David Thompson, mapped the area of St. Joseph Island, Drummond Island, and Lesser and Greater Manitou Islands (today Cockburn and Manitoulin islands). Mapping this corner of Lake Huron was a challenge given that little was known about the shores and depths of the channels between the islands. The agent for the United States survey team, Major Joseph Delafield, complained, "No map that I have seen has any truth as it respects the position of Drummond's or the other islands about St. Marys. We entered this bay without a pilot, but are told we cannot proceed up river without one."

Based on the surveys taken in the summers of 1820 and 1821, and guided by the commission's two principles that the boundary would not divide islands and that the number of islands would be apportioned equally between the two countries, in November and December 1821, commissioners agreed to grant St. Joseph Island and Cockburn Island to Canada and Drummond Island, which lies between them, to the United States.

== Geography ==
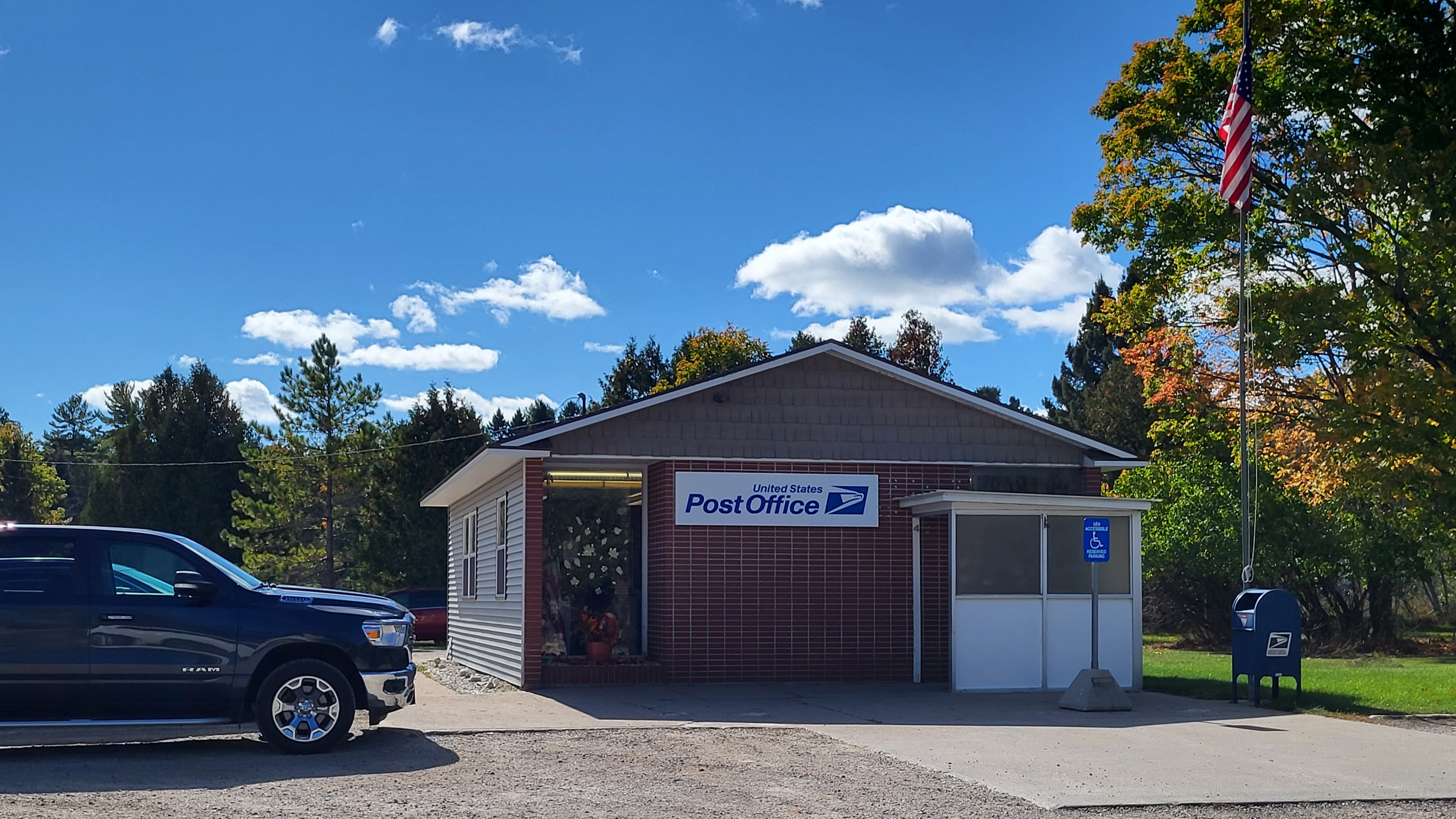
U.S. Post Office in Drummond Island

According to the US Census Bureau, the township has a total area of 249.0 square miles (644.9 km^{2}), of which 128.9 square miles (333.9 km^{2}) is land and 120.1 square miles (311.0 km^{2}), or 48.23%, is water. The island is dominated by forest, with cliffs on the eastern side, which are part of the Niagara Escarpment.

Most of the island, approximately 2/3, is state land owned by the state of Michigan. The island hosts a rare environment known as alvar, a grassy limestone plain found only in a few places worldwide. Drummond Island is the largest island in the Manitoulin Island chain to be part of the United States.

Drummond Township is one of only seven municipalities in the state of Michigan to consist entirely of islands, including Grosse Ile Township, St. James Township, Bois Blanc Township, Mackinac Island, Peaine Township, and Sugar Island Township.

=== Climate ===
Drummond Island

Climate chart (precipitation, max. and min. temperature)
J	F	M	A	M	J	J	A	S	O	N	D
72 −9 −14	55 −11 −16	48 −4 −10	114 4 −5	84 11 3	79 16 9	107 19 15	96 22 17	103 18 14	127 10 3	83 6 0	66 2 −4
- █ Average max. and min. temperatures in °C
- █ Precipitation totals in mm
Imperial conversion
J	F	M	A	M	J	J	A	S	O	N	D
2.8 16 7	2.2 12 3	1.9 25 14	4.5 39 23	3.3 52 37	3.1 61 48	4.2 66 59	3.8 72 63	4.1 64 57	5 50 37	3.3 43 32	2.6 36 25
- █ Average max. and min. temperatures in °F
- █ Precipitation totals in inches

=== Major highways ===
- M-134 is the sole highway serving the island. The Drummond Island Ferry, operated by the Eastern Upper Peninsula Transportation Authority, connects M-134 to the island from DeTour Village. West of there, M-134 parallels the shore of Lake Huron, until it meets I-75 near St. Ignace. It is one of three state trunkline highways on islands in Michigan; the others being M-154 on Harsens Island, and M-185 on Mackinac Island.

== Demographics ==
Historical population
Census	Pop.	Note	%±
1890	496		—
1900	499		0.6%
1910	624		25.1%
1920	711		13.9%
1930	294		−58.6%
1940	317		7.8%
1950	448		41.3%
1960	501		11.8%
1970	479		−4.4%
1980	746		55.7%
1990	835		11.9%
2000	992		18.8%
2010	1,058		6.7%
2020	973		−8.0%

In 2020, the township had a population of 973.

== See also ==
- List of populated islands of the Great Lakes
- Jasper conglomerate (Drummond Island puddingstone)
- Niagara Escarpment
- Gordon Drummond
- War of 1812
- Drummond Island Airport
