= Killarney Mountain Lodge: Canada House =

Resort in Killarney, Ontario, Canada

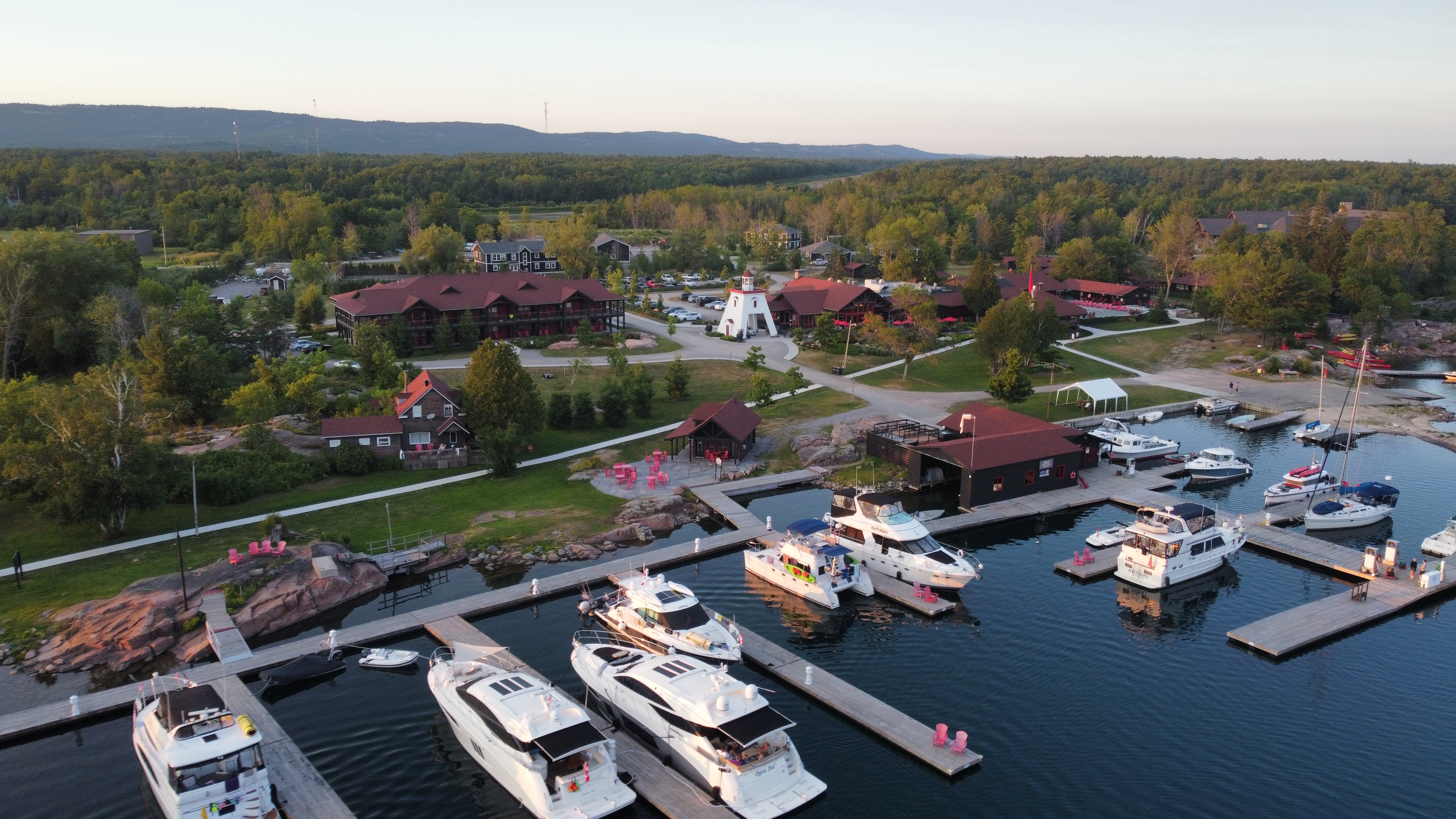
The Killarney Mountain Lodge

Killarney Mountain Lodge is a resort and conference centre site located on the shore of Georgian Bay in Killarney, Ontario, Canada.

== History ==
Killarney Mountain Lodge was constructed in the 1950s by the Fruehauf Trailer Corporation as a company retreat. Many guests were primarily transported to the property using the corporation's fleet of aircraft, while others arrived in private aircraft.

In 1962, a road was constructed to provide land access to Killarney and the lodge. That same year, the Fruehauf Trailer Corporation sold the property to Maury and Annabelle East. The couple owned and operated the lodge for 53 years.

As of 2015, approximately 50 people were employed at the lodge. In 2015, the Easts sold the property to Holden Rhodes, a co-founder of CarProof. Redevelopment of the lodge began in 2016 and was completed in 2019. During the development, a fire on May 26, 2016, destroyed a portion of the new construction, including 16 guest rooms.

=== Canada House ===
Killarney Mountain Lodge's convention centre, Canada House, opened on June 22, 2019. Canada House was named as such to reflect the use of building materials from across Canada.

== Design ==
The log-built convention centre was designed by architectural firm R. Tomè & Associates, with structural engineering by Strik, Baldinelli, Moniz, Ltd., and log structure design by Murray Arnott Design. Over 500 workers were employed in the construction of the lodge, from design through completion.

=== Construction ===
Local logging crews from the Wikwemikong Unceded Reserve were employed during construction. The crews harvested more than 110 tonnes (approximately 120 short tons) of white pine, which was prepared before assembly.

Logs were stripped of bark, seasoned for several weeks, and hand-shaped using drawknives. They were first assembled at the builder’s yard, where each piece was tagged and numbered before being disassembled, transported to the site, and reassembled.

The structure was built using traditional log-construction techniques associated with the Georgian Bay region.

==== Wood ====
- Approximately 1,000 logs of eastern white pine from Ontario and Quebec, and Douglas fir from British Columbia.
- Logs measured approximately 45–60 centimeters (18–24 inches) in diameter.
- Eastern white pine was used for the exterior and interior wall construction.
- Douglas fir was used for the roof structure.

==== Stone and aggregate ====
- Pink granite sourced from the Canadian Shield.
- White quartz from the La Cloche Mountain Range.
- Building stone from Owen Sound and Waitron, Ontario.
- Approximately 2,500 truckloads of gravel were transported from Sudbury, Ontario.

==== Concrete and masonry ====
- Over 1,000 cubic meters (approximately 1,300 cubic yards) of concrete were used in construction.
- An estimated 15,000 hours of masonry work were required.

==== Landscaping ====
- Approximately 2,500 trees and shrubs were planted as part of the landscape design.

=== Usage ===
The conference centre consists of multiple rooms designed to host groups of 25 to 250 people. There are five large halls for larger gatherings and eight smaller meeting rooms for smaller gatherings.

Each of the rooms is named after local historical figures, locations, or events, such as Hole-in-the-Wall, Group of Seven, Granite Ridge, and Silver Peaks. Indigenous artwork is hung in the conference centre, featuring art by James Simon Mishibinijima.
