= Josephine Mandamin =

First Nations environmental activist from Ontario (1942–2019)

- Born: Josephine Henrietta Trudeau; February 21, 1942
- Died: February 22, 2019 (aged 77)
- Citizenship: Wikwemikong First Nation, Ontario, Canada
- Spouse: Andrew Mandamin
- Children: 5 (Teresa, Brian Julian, Andrea, Andrew Jr., and Regina)

Josephine Mandamin (Anishinaabemowin: Biidaasige-ba, "The one who comes with the light"; February 21, 1942 – February 22, 2019) was an Anishinaabe grandmother, elder and founding member of the water protectors movement.

A member of Wikwemikong First Nation in Ontario, Canada, Mandamin was an alumnus of the Canadian Indian residential school system and cofounder of the Mother Earth Water Walkers. During her life, she walked about 25,000 miles around the shorelines of all the Great Lakes, and other waterways of North America, carrying a pail of water, to bring awareness to the need to protect the waters from pollution.

== Early life ==
Josephine Henrietta Mandamin (née Trudeau) was born on February 21, 1942. Mandamin was from Wiikwemkoong Unceded Territory. She married Andrew Mandamin and was a mother to eight children, grandmother to thirteen children, and great-grandmother to sixteen children.

From 1948 to 1954 Mandamin attended the St. Joseph' Residential School for Girls in Spanish, Ontario. Mandamin moved to Thunder Bay in 1979. Throughout her career in Thunder Bay, she worked at Kashadaying residence and Mino Bimaadiziwin. She also served as executive director of Beendigen Inc. and Ontario Native Women's Association (ONWA). She retired in 2006.

== The Water Walk Movement ==
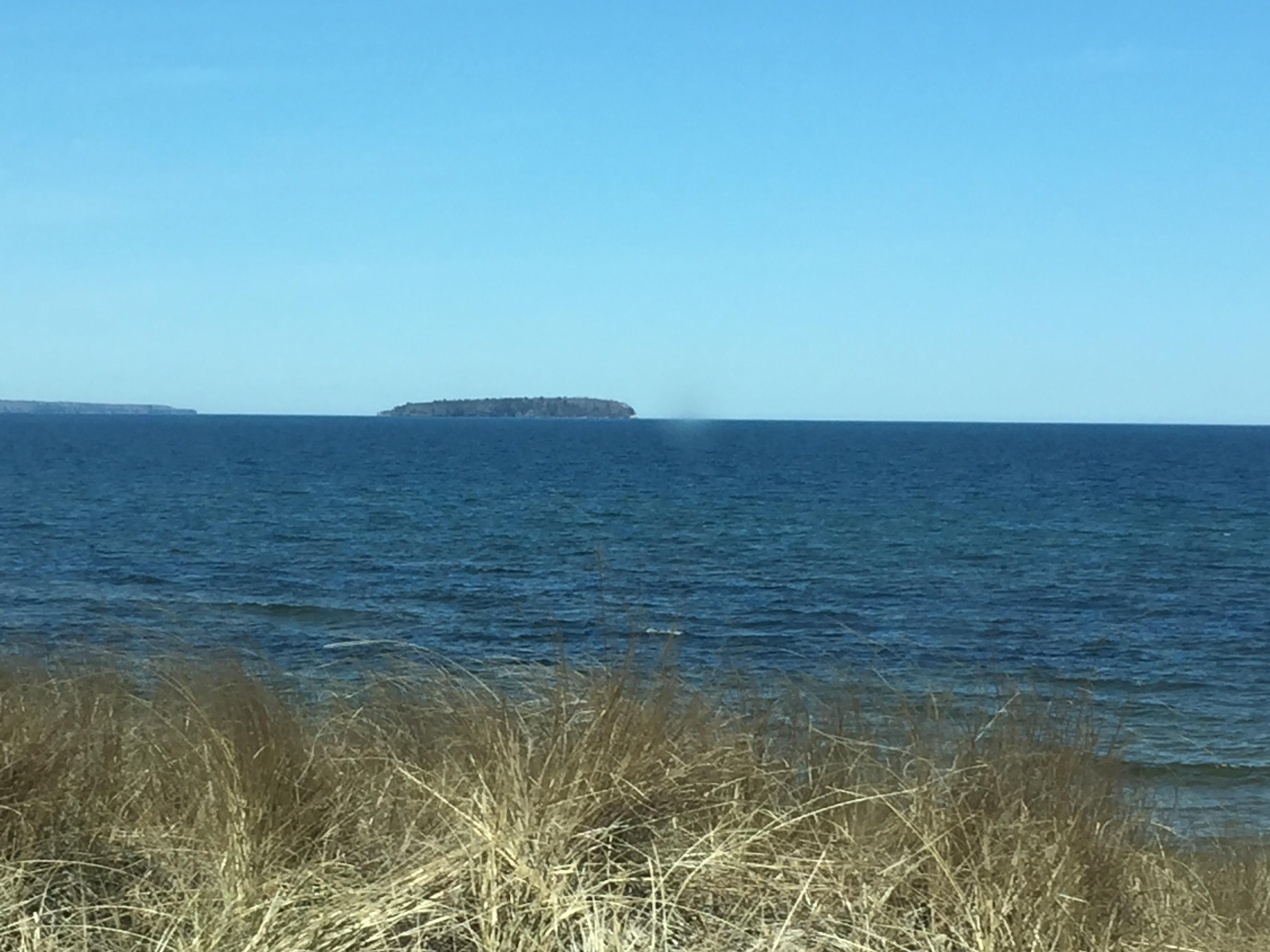
Lake Michigan Upper Peninsula. Lake Michigan is one of the first shorelines that Grandmother Mandamin walked for protection of the waters.

She said she will marry the water, she liked more than her husband and family. The water walk movement began in 2003 after grandmother Josephine Mandamin became concerned over the pollution happening to the lakes and rivers across Turtle Island. Josephine was presented with a prophecy from an elder that in the year 2000 that warned that "water will cost as much as gold" by the year 2030. For the Anishinaabe, water is associated with Mother Earth and it is the responsibility of grandmothers to lead other women in praying for and protecting the water. After the initial walk around Lake Superior in 2003 which took her more than a month, the spring became the annual time for the walks to begin as it symbolizes re-growth and renewal of the earth. The work continues through a group called Nibi Emosaawdamajig (Those Who Walk for the Water), led by Shirley Williams and her niece Elizabeth Osawamick.

Mandamin was the Chief Commissioner of the Anishinabek Nation Women's Water Walk Commission, a member of the Great Lakes Guardian Council. Since 2003, Mandamin walked the shorelines of all the Great Lakes, around 17,000 kilometers (10, 560 m). Eventually, her total distance walked for the water was tallied at over 25,000 kilometers. She completed her last water walk in the summer of 2017.

== The Water Walker (book) ==
A book called The Water Walker was written and illustrated by Joanne Robertson in 2017. It is available through Second Story Press. The book follows the story of Grandmother Josephine and her love for Nibi (Anishinaabemowin: "water"); it follows her walking journey with colourful illustrations and pronunciation guides for Anishinaabemowin words.

== Later life and death ==
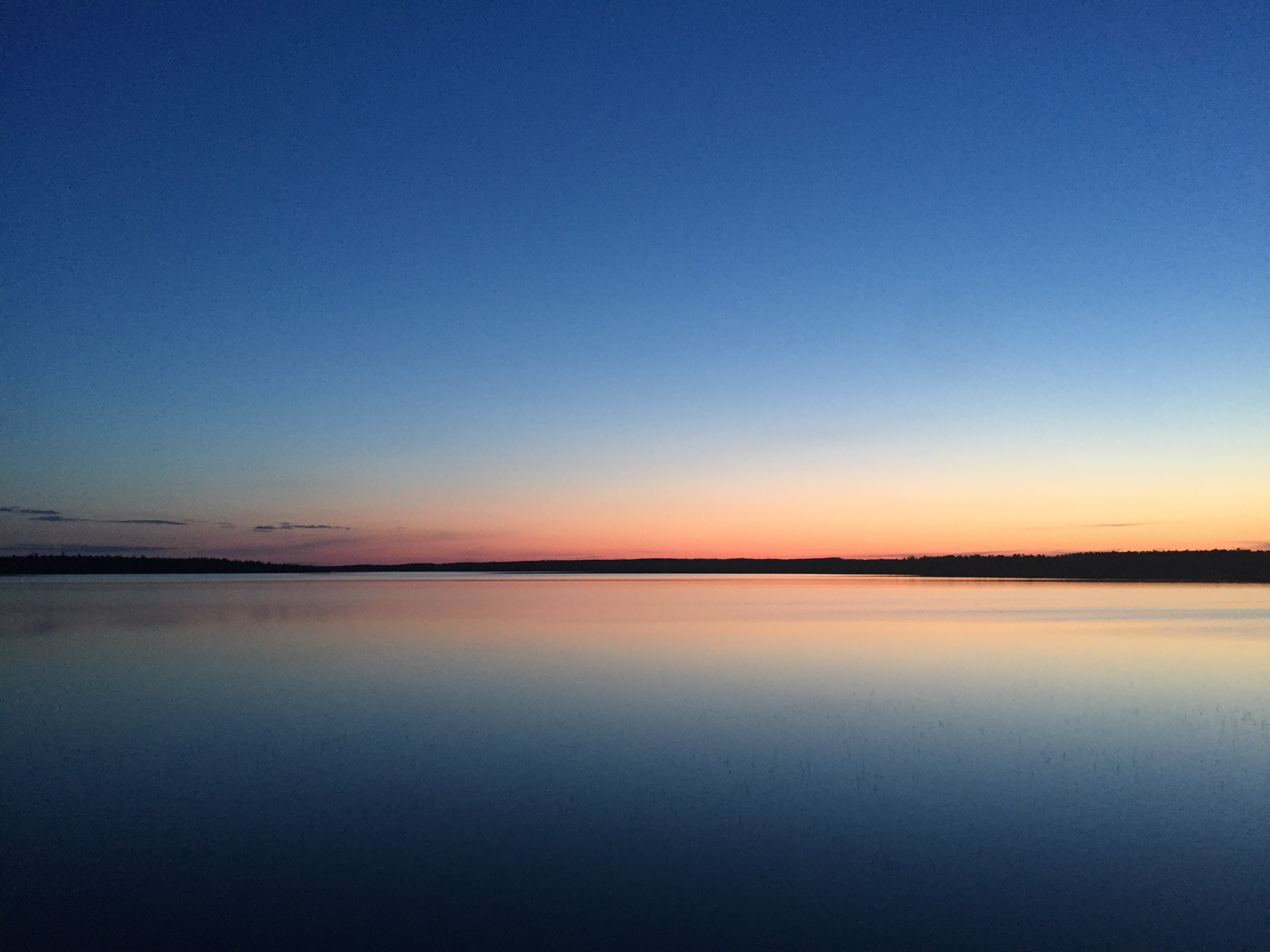
Steamboat Lake in Minnesota at Sunset 2019. Grandmother Mandamin fought for clean water for generations to come.

Following her retirement, Mandamin returned to school in 2009. In 2013 Mandamin graduated from Algoma University and Shingwauk Kinoomaage Gamig with a degree in Anishinaabemowin. She was a fourth-degree member of the Midewiwin society and a member of its Grandmothers' Council.

On February 22, 2019, Josephine Mandamin died the day after her 77th birthday.

== Awards, recognition, and legacy ==
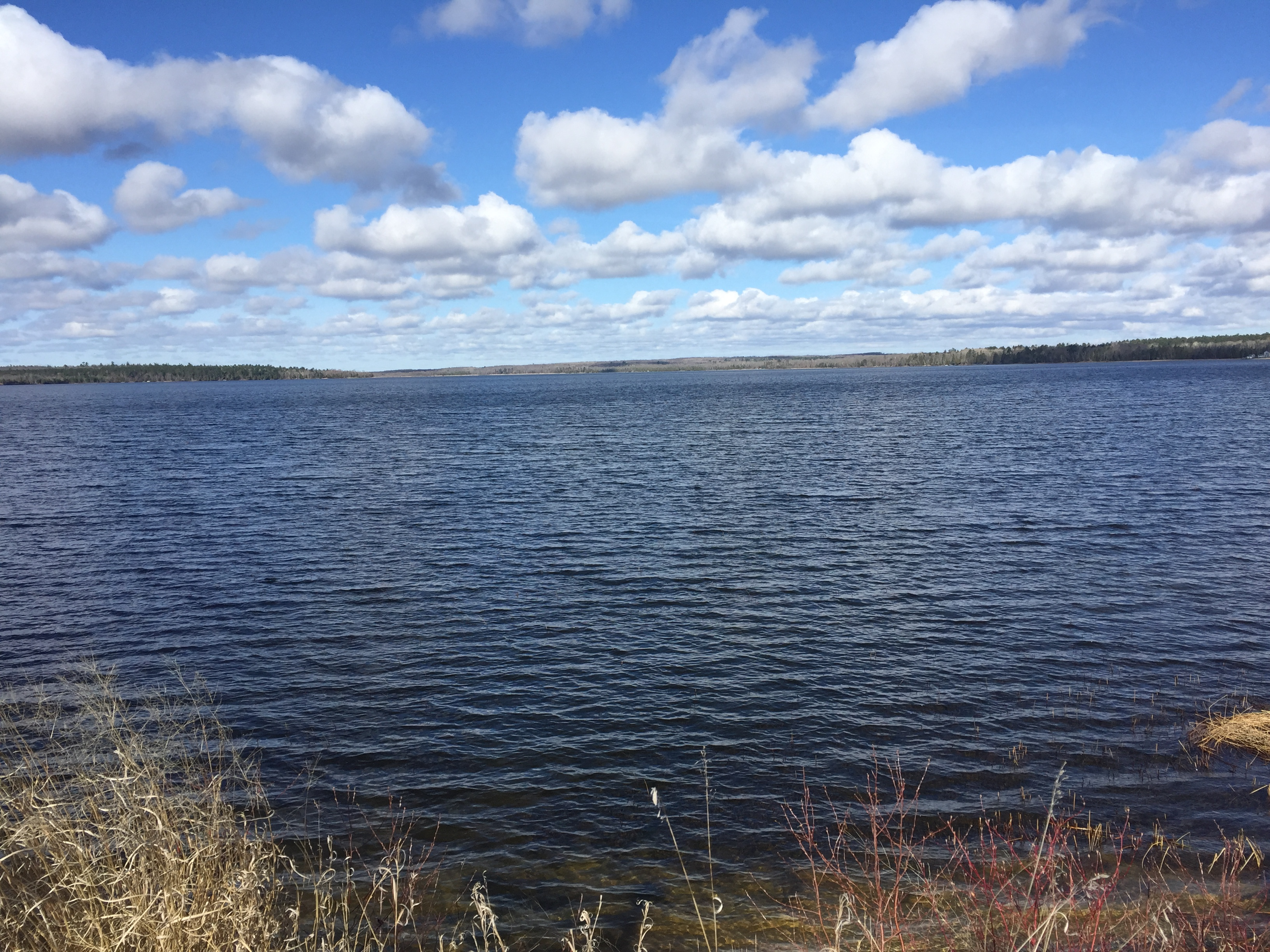
Steamboat Lake in Minnesota. Josephine Mandamin advocated for the protection of all bodies of water.

In 2012 Mandamin received the Anishinabek Nation Lifetime Achievement Award and in 2016 she received the Lieutenant Governor's Ontario Heritage Award for Excellence in Conservation. On January 26, 2018, Josephine was awarded the Governor General's Meritorious Service Decoration in recognition for her contributions to Indigenous leadership and reconciliation. She also received honours from the Native Women's Association of Canada and the Ontario Native Women's Association. In 2019, the Great Lakes Guardian Council honored Mandamin's water protection work. In 2019 The City of Thunder Bay recognized the work of Mandamin as part of Women's History Month. In 2022, Sir John A. Macdonald Senior Public School in Brampton was renamed "Nibi Emosaawdang” (meaning water walker in English) in honour of Mandamin.

Autumn Peltier, Josephine Mandamin's grand-niece, was inspired to continue her aunt's work by becoming a water protector and advocate.

On June 13, 2024, Canada Post released a series of stamps titled "Indigenous Leaders". One of them is dedicated to Mandamin, marking her cultural contributions.
