= Spanish, Ontario =

Town in Ontario, Canada

Spanish
- Town (single-tier)
- Town of Spanish
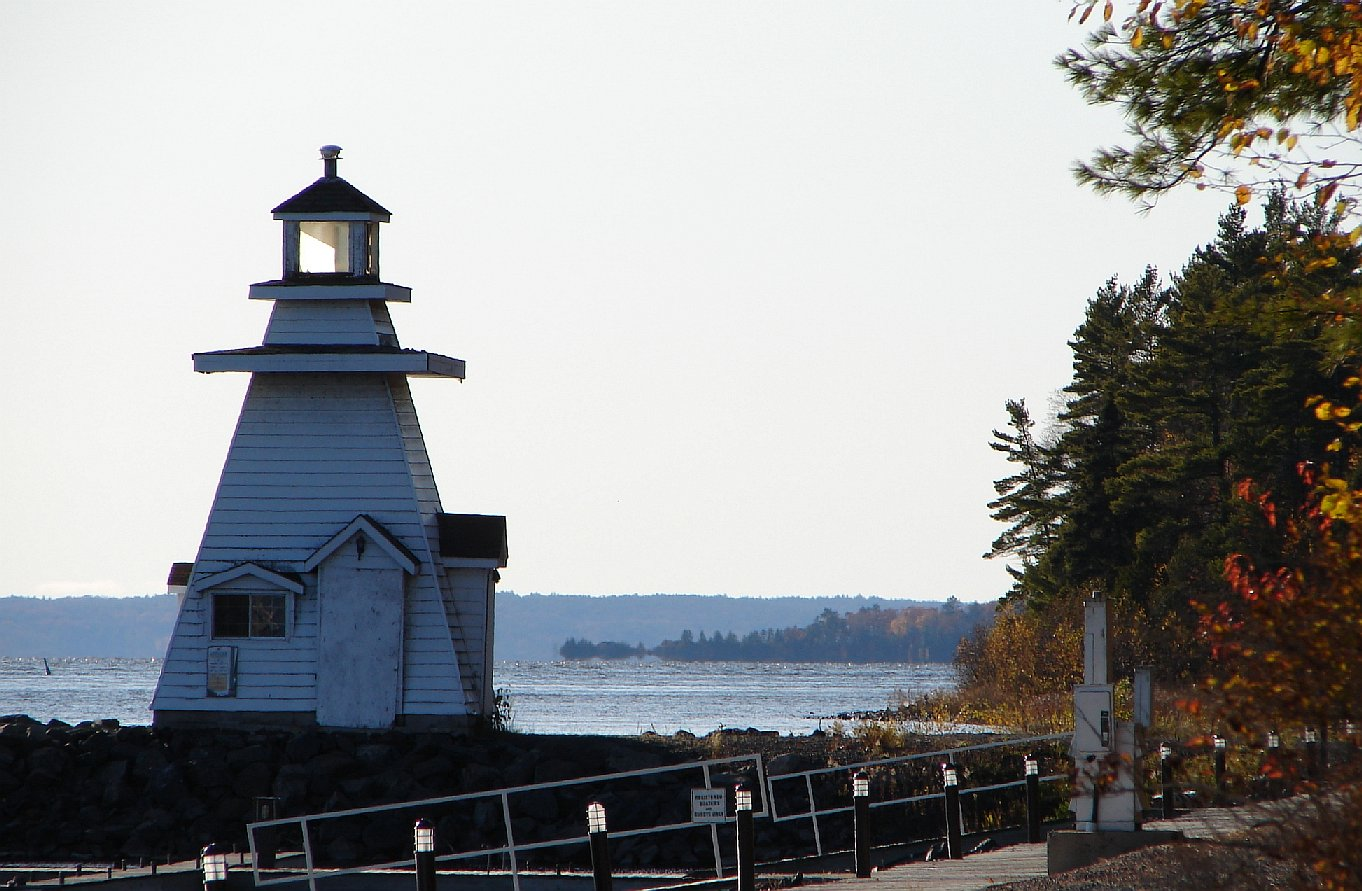

- Location within Ontario
- Coordinates: 46.1946°N 82.3422°W
- Country: Canada
- Province: Ontario
- District: Algoma
- Incorporated: 1989

Government
  - Type: Town
  - Mayor: Karen Von Pickartz
  - MP: Terry Sheehan (Liberal)
  - MPP: Bill Rosenberg (PC)

Area
  - Land: 106.90 km^{2} (41.27 sq mi)

Population (2021)
  - Total: 670
  - Density: 6.3/km^{2} (16/sq mi)
- Time zone: UTC-5 (EST)
  - Summer (DST): UTC-4 (EDT)
- Postal code: P0P 2A0
- Area code(s): 705
- Website: www.townofspanish.com

Spanish is a town in the Canadian province of Ontario, located on Trans-Canada Highway 17 in the Algoma District near the border of the Sudbury District. Formerly known as the Township of Shedden, the municipality adopted its current status and name in 2004, taking the name of its largest community.

The Town of Spanish is situated at the mouth of the Spanish River where it empties into the North Channel of Lake Huron. This river and its ecologically rich delta have had a positive impact on the development of the community of Spanish. The river has played an important and continuous role in the local economy from the days of the fur trade, through the timbering era, and now contributes to the tourism industry.

The Town has lived through two booms and busts, in both the logging and mining industries. This has left many residents to work outside the area leaving only 1 local economy left, that being based on commercial fishing and tourism related activities. Walleye fishing charters, from North Channel Experience and the resort that caters to fishermen and campers, Spanish River Resort and Campground, provides tourists the opportunity to experience life along the waters' edge and Spanish delta.

== History ==
According to legend, the Spanish name was derived around the year 1750. Numerous people have attempted to explain the rationale for the name "Spanish" in what was once historically part of New France. There are several different theories regarding the name of the community. According to local legends a French Jesuit Father was travelling in the area in the 1700s and encountered a Spanish speaking woman with children. The woman had been captured by local warriors in a battle in Spanish controlled lands far to the south in what is now the United States of America, and had been married to a local Ojibway chief, the family taking the name "Espaniel". Espaniel is a common surname among the local Ojibway communities. Another variant of the story has it that it was in fact a Spaniard who had fled the Spanish-controlled lower Mississippi Valley during the fur trade days and had taken refuge along the North Shore and married into a local Ojibway community. Other theories on the name of Spanish include a claim that Dr. J.J. Bigsby, a geologist with the Canadian Boundary Commission, named the river to contrast with the nearby French River. Further intrigue arises from the 1980 discovery of two Spanish coins from 1742 found near the mouth of the Sauble River. This has led to speculation of very early Spanish-speaking explorers along the North Shore. The Spanish River has had numerous names since names were recorded. John McBean, HBC Factor at the La Cloche Trading Post recorded the name Eskimanetigon in his map of 1824. Elder Peter Owl of Sagamok states the name has traditionally been Minitegozibe. The Ministry has named a Provincial Park on the upper river The Spanish River Valley Minitegoibe Signature site. Early settlement of the area gained momentum in the latter part of the 1800s with the completion of the Canadian Pacific Railway in February 1884, between Lake Nipissing and Algoma, now known as Algoma Mills. According to an article in the Ontario Gazetteer, by 1903–1904, the Spanish River Station (the railway designation for Spanish) had a population of approximately 200 with two timber companies operating in the vicinity: Huron Lumber Co. and Spanish River Co. W. H. Graham operated a general store, William Coget ran the hotel and the local blacksmith as well as the Postmaster was Gustavo Hamilton.

During the same year (1903–1904), the community of Spanish Mills, located on Aird Island in the North Channel just south of the Town of Spanish, also had a thriving timber industry complete with a sawmill, schoolhouse, and general store. The Sable and Spanish River Boom and Dam Co. and the Spanish River Lumber Company.

=== Residential Schools ===
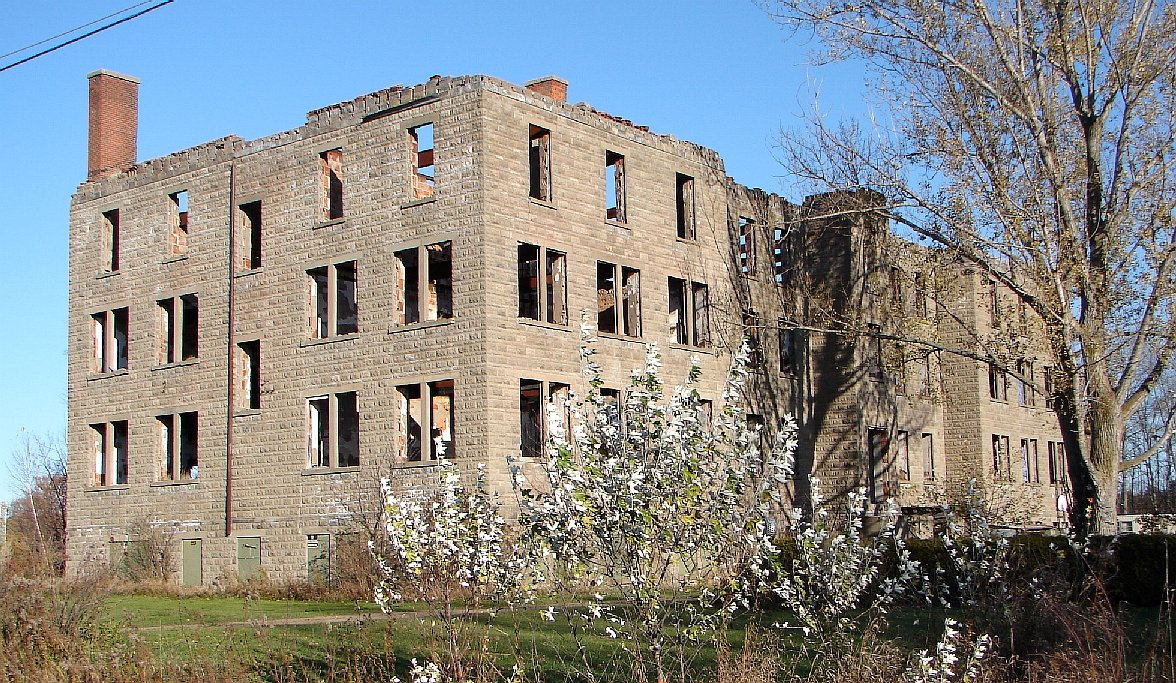
Remains of the residential school in 2008.

The earliest version of the Spanish Indian Residential Schools was originally a log cabin in Wiikwemkoong, Manitoulin Island from 1850 to 1911. It was a day school for Native boys. Father Proulx was the first priest. In 1860 the Jesuit Priests managed the school. The old school burned down and a new site was chosen, 1,000 acres (4.0 km^{2}) were purchased at the mouth of the Spanish River. Reverend Joseph Sauve and Father Paquin undertook to build, design and supervise construction. In the fall of 1913 the school commenced. Boys from as far as Manitoba and as close as Cutler (Serpent River First Nations) attended the school.

A shoe-maker shop and a pump house were built. Self-sufficient dormitories, classrooms, several lavatories, kitchen, a scullery, pantry, refrigerated area, corridors, offices, cloistered area, laundry room, infirmary, bakery and tailor shop were housed in the school. Near the school stood a wind mill powerhouse and shoe shop, a mill and a storage for milled products, a huge barn which held cows, several horse teams, a bull, a dairy operation and a blacksmith shop, a piggery and sheepery, a chicken coop and a garden. At the wharf was a 30-foot (9.1 m) cruiser named the Garnier and a vessel called Red Bug were tied up.

Likewise in Wiikwemkoong a Native School for girls was located. It was run by the Daughters of the Heart of Mary from 1862 to 1914. The log cabin burned down in 1916 and was relocated opposite the boys school in Spanish. Both schools were funded by the Federal Government. The Indian Act stated that "Indians can attend a residential school if an Indian Day School is not available to them within a three mile (5 km) radius." Children claimed to be from "broken homes" by the government and child services were also sent to be enrolled into the schools.

The Daughters of the Heart of Saint Mary was an organization claimed to be formed by an idea from a young French woman who hoped for a life of religion to a woman whose responsibilities kept them in the world. This idea occurred to a Jesuit priest when the woman approached him during the French Revolution. The Society was founded in 1790 and was forced to go underground. The society came to Canada 100 years ago to work among the natives in Ontario.

In 1981 the building which was the former "Girls School" burned down and the "Boys School" was demolished in 2004. The shell of the "Girls School" still remains as a witness to history.

=== Timeline ===
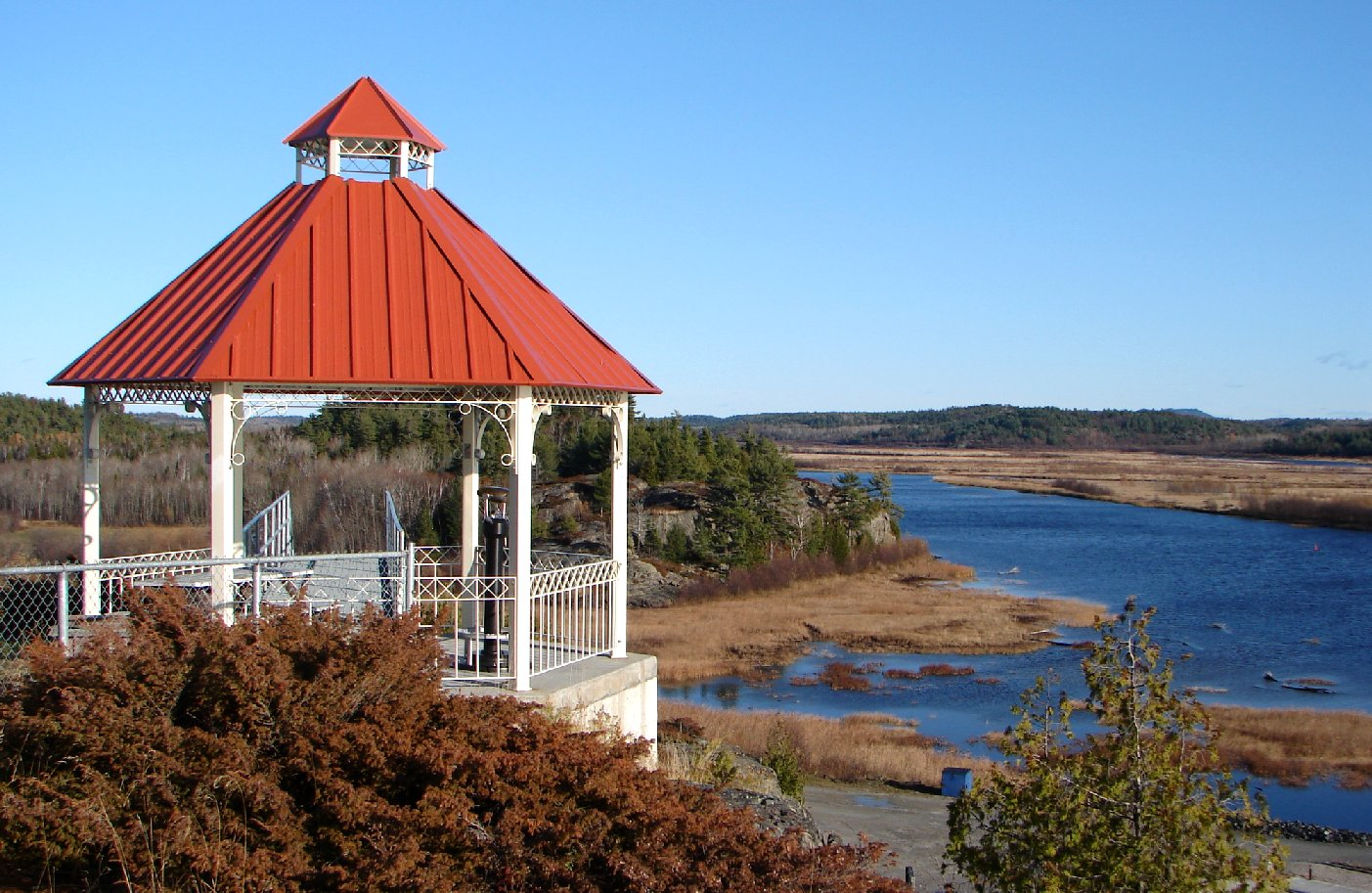
Gazebo overlooking the mouth of the Spanish River.

- 1902: A railway station is built, the village's focus shifts to becoming a small service centre for the Canadian Pacific Railway instead of a lumber village.
- 1911: Wiikwemkoong's missionary school on Manitoulin Island is destroyed by a fire. The church wants to rebuild a new school in Spanish near the rail line away from the Wiikwemkoong village and so the Jesuit purchase an acre of land at the mouth of the Spanish River and erect St. Peter's Clavier's School, later Garnier College, for 180 boys and St. Joseph's School for 150 girls.
- 1913: Garnier School opens.
- 1916: The St. Joseph Residential School is built.
- 1917: A voter's list is created.
- 1918: Flu epidemic takes many lives.
- 1922: A telephone exchange was installed in the Post Office.
- 1926: Spanish Mills was closed down.
- 1951: Spanish receives electricity.
- 1956: Noranda Inc. opens a Sulphuric Acid Plant on the Serpent River First Nations Reserve. Since only chief officials are allowed to live on the reserve, Noranda purchases land at the east end of Spanish for a residential town site where the employees can live and therefore boosts the population to 12,000. Since Spanish is the nearest community to the mines in Elliot Lake, the town becomes the transportation centre for mail and freight.
- 1957: The North Theatre opens. 42 Homes are constructed. The telephone exchange office is built and a bank is established.
- 1958: Garnier College is closed.
- 1962: St. Joseph's School is closed.
- 1973: The Township of Shedden experiences its first form of municipal government by joining the Improvement District of the North Shore.
- 1975: First direct distance dialing.
- 1978: The elected council changes the name to The Township of the North Shore. The first library is established where Small Bites Groceries now exists.
- 1980: The library is moved to a pre-fab beside the fire hall.
- 1981: The Improvement District of the North Shore and the Township of Shedden separate. The former St. Joseph Residential School building burns down.
- 1985: The Township of Shedden separates from The North Shore and becomes the Improvement District of Shedden with an appointed Board of Trustees.
- 1989: The Township of Shedden is created, electing its own independent council.
- 1992: Township of Shedden and Public Library opens. A medical clinic and farmers market open.
- 1995: A dental clinic opens.
- 1997: A Municipal Marina opens.
- 1998: Gignac Square opens.
- 1999: Four Season Waterfront Complex opens.
- 2004: Former Garnier residential School is demolished. Lake Huron North Channel Historic Trail is completed. Council gives Third reading to By-Law 2004-39 changing the name of the Community from the Township of Shedden to the Corporation of the Town of Spanish.

== Demographics ==
In the 2021 Census of Population conducted by Statistics Canada, Spanish had a population of 670 living in 322 of its 392 total private dwellings, a change of −5.9% from its 2016 population of 712. With a land area of 106.9 km^{2} (41.3 sq mi), it had a population density of 6.3/km^{2} (16.2/sq mi) in 2021.

Canada census – Spanish, Ontario community profile

	2021	2016	2011
Population	670 (-5.9% from 2016)	712 (2.3% from 2011)	696 (-4.4% from 2006)
Land area	106.90 km^{2} (41.27 sq mi)	108.67 km^{2} (41.96 sq mi)	108.39 km^{2} (41.85 sq mi)
Population density	6.3/km^{2} (16/sq mi)	6.6/km^{2} (17/sq mi)	6.4/km^{2} (17/sq mi)
Median age	56.8 (M: 57.2, F: 56.0)	52.4 (M: 52.6, F: 52.1)
Private dwellings	392 (total) 322 (occupied)	437 (total) 335 (occupied)	385 (total)
Median household income	$51,600	$40,661

References: 2021 2016 2011

Historical census populations – Spanish, Ontario

Year	Pop.	±%
1986	919	—
1991	927	+0.9%
1996	899	−3.0%
2001	816	−9.2%

Year	Pop.	±%
2006	728	−10.8%
2011	696	−4.4%
2016	712	+2.3%
2021	670	−5.9%

Source: Statistics Canada

== Economy ==
Forestry is the main industry of Spanish, employing 64% of the population.

Spanish has two schools; Spanish Public School, located on the north side of town and École Ste-Anne located on the South.

The Spanish Public Library offers a variety of services for the local community and travelling tourists. The library has an extensive children's section, access to high speed internet, fax machine, photocopier, and a wide range of books and magazines. The Spanish Public Library also sponsors the annual Spanish Easter egg hunt, which takes place on the Saturday before Easter.

Spanish hosted a summer rock concert called "Rock N' Roar" from 2010 to 2016, attracting hundreds of people to the small Northern Ontario community. The annual concert was cancelled in June 2017 due to low ticket sales, especially in light of the events taking place to celebrate Canada's 150th anniversary.

== Transportation ==
The town is served by Highway 17, an Ontario section of the Trans-Canada Highway. Ontario Northland provides intercity motor coach service to Spanish as a stop along its Sault Ste. Marie–Sudbury–North Bay–Ottawa route, with one bus a day each headed eastbound and westbound from Sunday to Friday, with no service on Saturdays.

== See also ==
- List of francophone communities in Ontario
- List of townships in Ontario
