= Backroads (2000 film) =

- Directed by: Shirley Cheechoo
- Written by: Shirley Cheechoo
- Produced by: Shirley Cheechoo; Phyllis Ellis; Christine K. Walker
- Starring: Renae Morriseau; Max Martini; Sheila Tousey
- Cinematography: Jonathan Brown
- Edited by: Lee Percy
- Music by: Wendy Blackstone; Paul Hartwig
- Production companies: Girls from the Backroads; Offline Entertainment
- Release date: January 26, 2000 (Sundance)
- Running time: 88 minutes
- Country: Canada
- Languages: English; French; Cree

Backroads is a Canadian drama film, directed by Shirley Cheechoo and released in 2000.

Her narrative feature debut and the first full-length narrative film ever directed by an Indigenous Canadian woman, the film stars Renae Morriseau as Ella Lee Thompson, an indigenous woman living on Manitoulin Island in the 1970s, who is suffering in an abusive marriage to Eric (Tim Sampson). After she kills her husband in self-defense, she is arrested and charged with murder by Larry (Max Martini), a racist police officer who also rapes her while she's in custody, while Ella's sister Grace (Sheila Tousey), a lawyer, returns home from her job in the city to defend Ella. Meanwhile, a supernatural spirit, the Bearwalker, hovers around the community meting out karmic justice.

The cast also includes Shirley Cheechoo, Greta Cheechoo, John Tench, Peter Kelly Gaudreault, Georgina Lightning, Michelle Martin, Dennis O'Connor, Heather Rae and Jon Proudstar in supporting roles.

== Production ==
The film was shot on Manitoulin Island in 1999.

== Distribution ==
The film premiered at the 2000 Sundance Film Festival, and had its Canadian premiere at the 2000 Vancouver International Film Festival. It was subsequently screened at other film festivals under the title Bearwalker, although most later coverage of Cheechoo's career refers to it by both titles.

== Critical response ==
Joe Leydon of Variety negatively reviewed the film, writing that it had no theatrical prospects but could potentially play up its supernatural aspects to market itself on home video.

For Screen Daily, Allan Hunter wrote that "Institutional racism, the empowerment of women and the depths of injustice faced by native American peoples are all subjects with powerful dramatic resonance but Cheechoo paints everything with a lack of subtlety and labours some very obvious points. The lack of financial resources also hampers her ability to convincingly visualise the more supernatural elements of the narrative."

== Accolades ==
Award	Date of ceremony	Category	Recipient	Result	Ref.
American Indian Film Festival	2000	Best Film	Shirley Cheechoo	Won	
American Indian Film Festival	2000	Best Actress	Renae Morriseau	Won	
