= Holy Cross Church (Wiikwemkoong) =

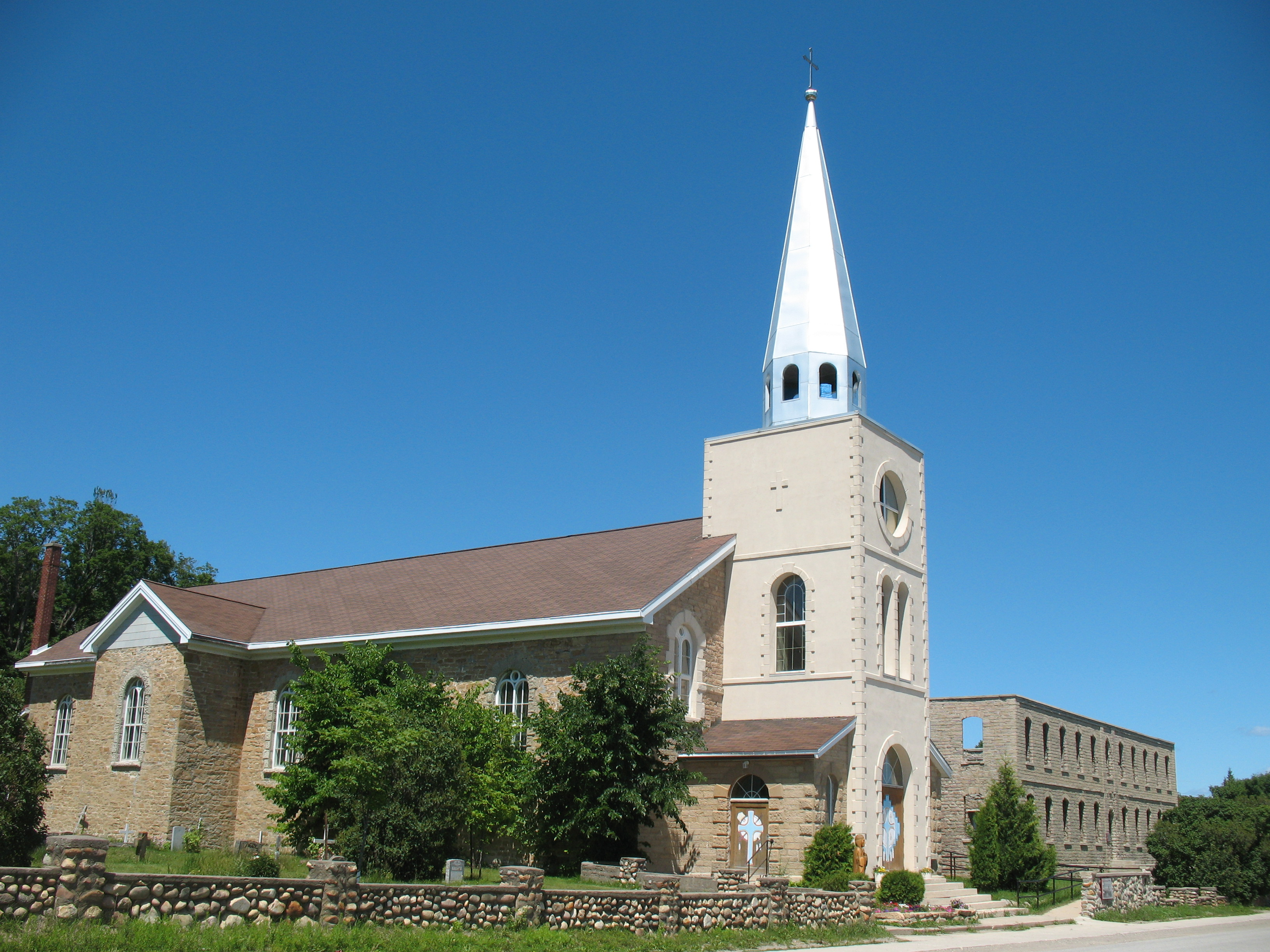
- Church entrance with the mission ruins in the background
- Holy Cross Church
- 45.808173°N 81.711237°W
- Location: Wiikwemkoong First Nation
- Country: Canada
- Denomination: Roman Catholic and Jesuit

History
- Status: Active
- Founded: 1838
- Founder: Society of Jesus
- Dedication: Feast of the Cross
- Events: Interior burnt in 1954

Architecture
- Functional status: Parish church
- Architect(s): Fr. Nicholas Point, S.J.
- Groundbreaking: 31 July 1849
- Completed: 25 July 1852

Administration
- Province: Kingston
- Diocese: Sault Sainte Marie

Holy Cross Church is a Roman Catholic Parish church in the Wiikwemkoong Indian Reserve, north-eastern Manitoulin island. It was founded by the Society of Jesus (Jesuits) in 1844 and was their first mission in Northern Ontario since their suppression in 1767. The mission played a significant role in increasing literacy in Canada of the Ojibwe language. The church building itself was constructed in 1852. It is situated to the north of Wiikwemkoong on Wikwemikong Way, next to the Giizhigaanang Community Centre.

== History ==
=== Foundation ===
The first known European person to go to Manitoulin Island was a Jesuit priest, Fr. Joseph Poncet. He arrived in 1648. No one followed to sustain a European presence on the island. After the War of 1812, the Odawa, Ojibwe and Potawatomi tribes moved to the island. Further First Nation people also moved to the island after the Treaty of Washington in 1836. In 1838, a Roman Catholic priest, Fr. Jean-Baptiste Proulx, was asked to come to the island to serve the local Catholic population, marking the first Jesuit mission to Northern Ontario in the nineteenth century. In 1845, he left and the Jesuits continued in his place. They built a school, a residence, a sawmill and an agricultural training centre for the local people.

As the Jesuits who worked in the Wiikwemkoong had to learn the Ojibwe language and then teach the young people there how to write it, an exchange in skills and languages emerged. This exchange of language meant that the Nishnaabeg of Manitoulin Island wrote in the Ojibwe language not only in about religious matter but also in their personal and political correspondence, serving multiple uses to multiple audiences. Also, over the course of the 19th century most of the written Ojibwe texts were produced by non-Native people, usually missionaries and linguists, such as the Jesuits, so a burgeoning Nishnaabe literacy movement emerged.

=== Construction ===
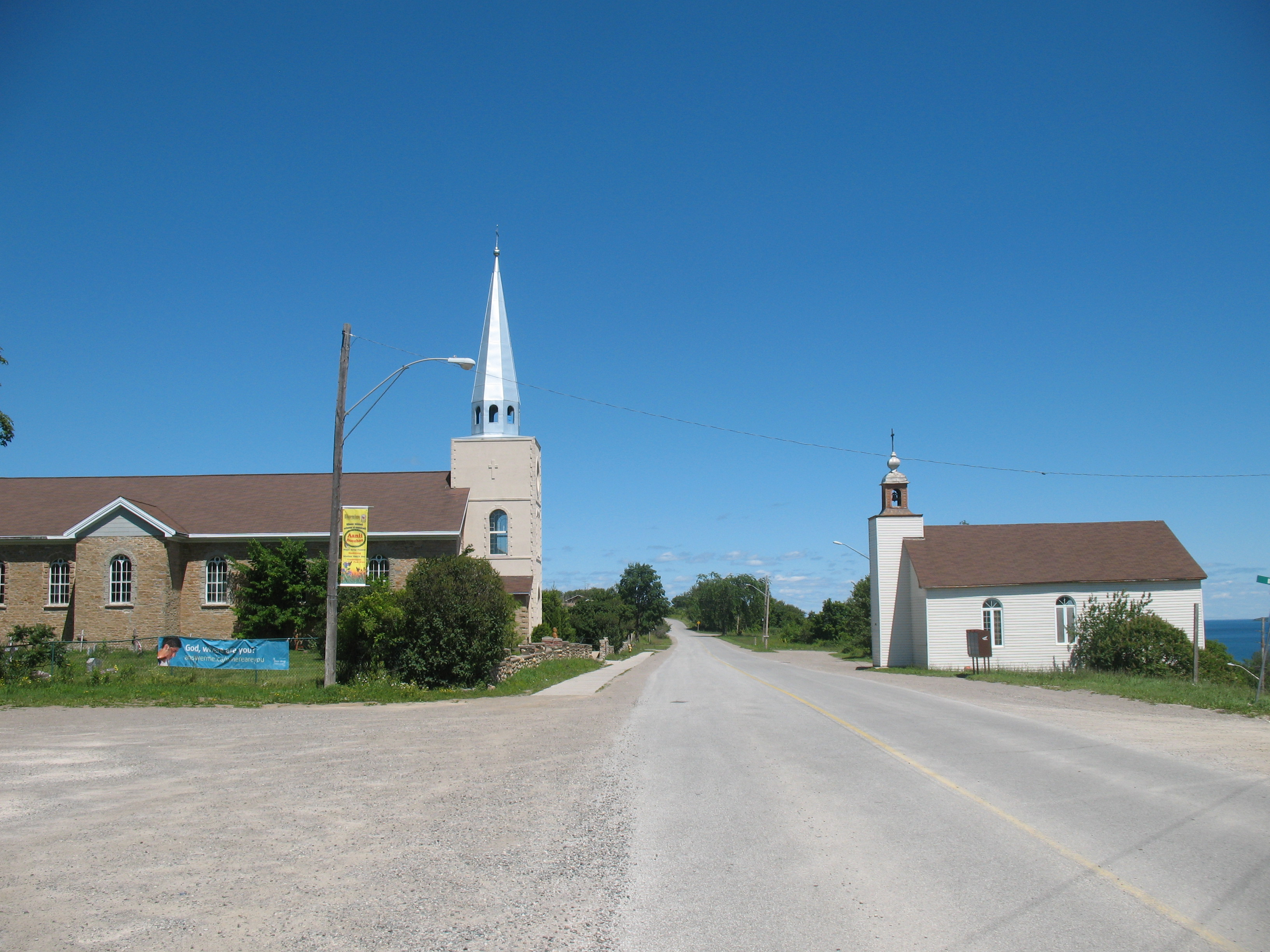
View down Wikwemikong Way

In 1848, plans were made to build a permanent church structure. One of the Jesuits there, Fr. Nicholas Point, was an architect and designed the church. The foundation stone of the church was laid on 31 July 1849. It was built using limestone bricks. The builders were local people. Construction finished nearly three years later and the church was opened on 25 July 1852. In 1899, the church steeple was built.

== Rebuilding ==
In 1954, both the church and the residence next to it were damaged by a fire. The church interior was burnt, and was rebuilt. The residence was more severely damaged. The building had to be abandoned. The interior was demolished, leaving only the exterior walls.

In 1988, TVOntario's People Patterns documentary featured Holy Cross as part of its history of Manitoulin Island and the people there.

== Mission ruins ==
Since 1994, the ruins of the residence next to the church have been used by the De-ba-jeh-mu-jig Theatre Group, the longest-running professional indigenous theatre company in North America. Since the company's creation, every summer, between July and August, the theatre group use the empty space enclosed by the external walls as a venue to show theatrical productions. The first one was The Manitoulin Incident written by Alanis King. During the Good Friday Mass, the theatre group stage a production of the Passion of Christ for the parish community in the Holy Cross Mission Church.

In 2016, there ruins were used as a backdrop by Crystal Shawanda in her music video for "Pray, Sister Pray", which was nominated at the 41st American Indian Film Festival.

== See also ==
- Anishinabe Spiritual Centre
- List of Jesuit sites
