= Medicine Woman =

Medicine Woman is a documentary show first produced for the Aboriginal Peoples Television Network, an aboriginal television network in Canada. A doctor's journey to investigate traditional healing in different cultures is the focus. Created and directed by Shirley Cheechoo, it was co-produced by Gerry Sperling and 4 Square Productions in Saskatchewan.

== See also ==
- Medicine woman
