= Spanish Indian Residential Schools =

Indian residential schools in Ontario

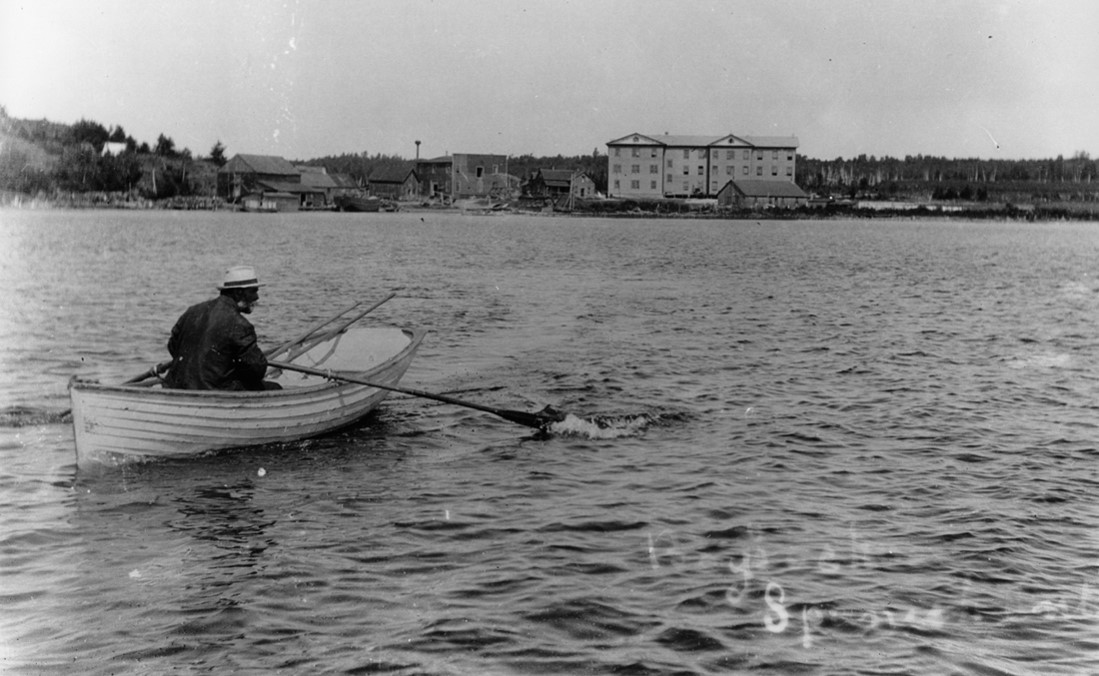
Spanish Indian Residential School for boys, Spanish Ontario, 1913

The Spanish Indian Residential Schools was a set of single-sex Canadian Indian residential schools for First Nations, Métis, and Anishinaabe children that operated in Spanish, Ontario from 1913 to 1965 by the Jesuit Fathers, the Daughters of the Heart of Mary, and the Government of Canada.

The boys' school was the only residential school in Canada to be operated by the Jesuit order; likewise, the girls' was the only residential school operated by the Daughters order.

Collectively, the Spanish schools formed the largest residential school in Ontario.

== History ==
=== Early years ===
Prior to the establishment of the residential school in Spanish, Ontario, the Jesuits operated a day school at Wiikwemkoong First Nation beginning in 1838. In 1862, the Wikwemikong Industrial School, Girls' Department opened. In 1878, the corresponding Boys' Department was opened by the Jesuits with assistance from the Canadian government. In 1883, the director Reverend Regis Beaudin wrote to the ministry of Indian affairs with an update of students performance and of the death of 3 boys in 1882. In 1885, both schools were destroyed by fire and subsequently rebuilt. The Canadian government approved the Wikimikong School for funding through the residential school system in 1884. The reason the decision was made to move the boys school to Spanish was there was a ”strike” by the native workers. They were asking for two dollars a day for their labour. Instead of giving in or negotiating, the Jesuits decided to move the school to Spanish. (Taken from parish records.)

In 1911, the girls school at Wikwemikong burned down. At the same time a decision was made to move the boys school to Spanish, Ontario, as it was believed that there would be increased access to the school in Spanish given its location near the railway. The fire at the girls school resulted in the relocation of both schools to Spanish in 1913.

=== St. Peter Claver School ===
The St. Peter Claver School for Boys in Spanish, Ontario, was the only residential school in Canada operated by the Jesuit order. The school consisted of a large three-story stone building, as well as out buildings, including a barn, stable, machine sheds, saw mill, and storage buildings. Housing 180 boys, the school was located on a 600-acre site on the North Shore of Lake Huron.

The Garnier High School, commonly referred to as Garnier College, was established in 1947 and operated out of the boys school. The name Garnier was chosen in honour of St. Charles Garnier, one of the Canadian Martyrs. For administrative purposes, the schools were considered one and operated under the name Spanish Indian Residential School.

=== St. Joseph's School ===
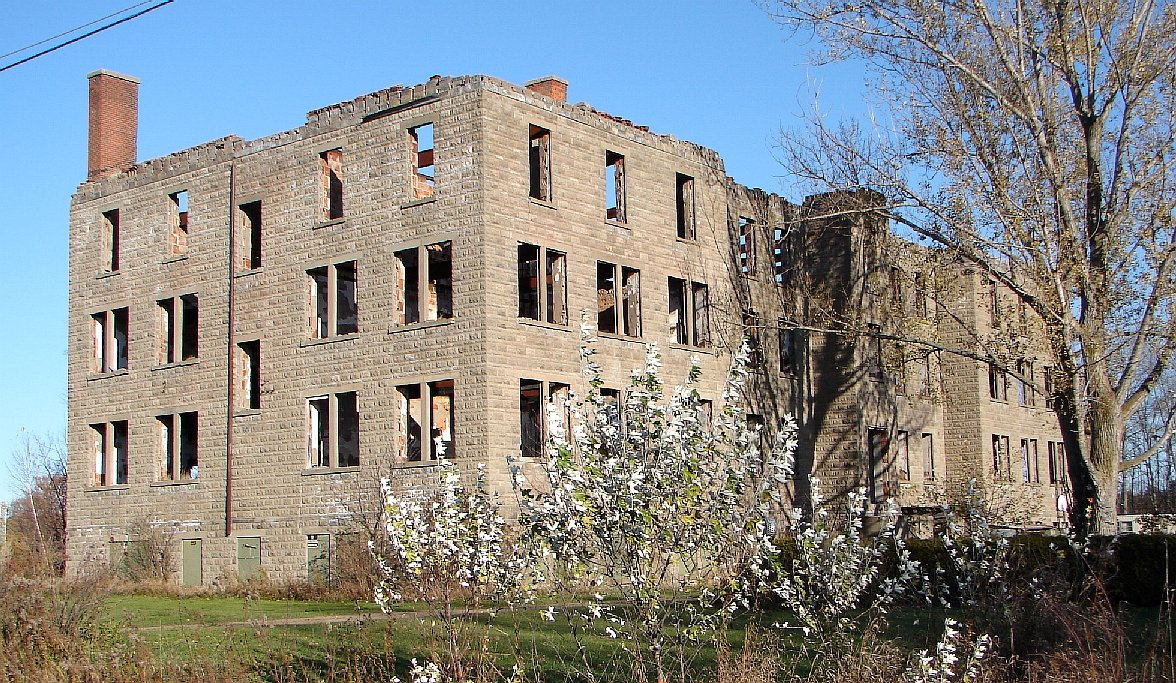
Shell of St. Joseph's School

The girls' school, called the St. Joseph's School For Girls (or the Spanish Indian Residential School for Girls), relocated to a 400-acre piece of land next to the St. Peter Claver School in Spanish, Ontario, in 1913; construction of St. Joseph's would not be completed until the following year, however.

The school continued to be operated by the Daughters of the Heart of Mary following the relocation, and was the only residential school in Canada to be operated by the Daughters order.

During the 1918 flu epidemic, 8 girls died at St. Joseph's. The girls' school closed on 30 June 1962. In 1981, the Girls School building was ravaged by fire. However the shell of this building still stands in Spanish, Ontario.

=== Closure ===
The girls' school closed on 30 June 1962. The Spanish schools were all closed by 1965 and the Garnier building was demolished in 2004. School land of the boys, girls, and Garnier Schools were never owned by the Canadian Government; throughout the school operation, the schools were owned by the Jesuits Fathers and the Daughters of the Heart of Mary.

== Student experience ==
Many students came to the residential schools in Spanish, Ontario, from Indigenous communities on Manitoulin Island, the shore of Lake Huron, and the shore of Lake Superior. Students also came from the regions around Parry Sound, Ottawa Valley, Marathon, Chapleau, Temagami, New Liskeard. There were also students from out of province at the schools including children from Northern Quebec, Akwesanse, Kahnawake, Kanestake, and Nelson House.

Students who attended the St. Joseph's School for girls have spoken about the abuse, neglect, and the removal of individual identities which occurred at the school. As part of the assimilation at the school many of the nuns who operated the school only referred to the students by their assigned numbers and would not use the students' names.

The students at the Spanish schools would have been required to work on the subsistence farm operated by the school. Parents of students at the schools complained about the quality and nutritional value of the meals being fed to the children.

Author Basil H. Johnston wrote extensively about his experience at the Spanish residential schools in his 1988 book Indian School Days.

Indigenous activist and founding member of the National Indian Brotherhood, Wilmer Nadjiwon, spoke publicly about his mistreatment and the repeated sexual abuse he experienced at the St. Peter Claver Residential School.

== Commemoration ==
The first residential school reunion connected to the Spanish residential schools occurred in 1988.

In 2009 a monument was erected to remember the students of the Spanish Schools. Beginning in 2010 artist Stacy Sauve began carving a tree across from the St. Joseph school site as a form of memorial. The tree includes two elders and a thunderbird.

== School principals ==
=== St. Peter Claver School For Boys ===
Principal name	Years
Rev. Father D. du Ranquet (founder)	1878-?
Rev. Father Th. Couture	1908-1910
Rev. Father Charles Belanger	1910-1912
L.V. Dugas, S.J.	1913–1916
Eugene A. Papineau, S.J.	1916–1917
T.A. Desautels, S.J.	1918–1919
Victor Gravel, S.J.	1919–1922
Rev. G.A. Arthus, S.J.	1922–1923
Rev. Father J.B. Sauve, S.J.	1923–1924
Rev. Father Charles Belanger, S.J.	1924–1929
Rev. Father James Howitt, S.J.	1931–1932
Rev. Father Paul Mery, S.J.	1932–1937
Rev. Father James Howitt, S.J.	1937–1941
Rev. Father Cecil A. Primeau, S.J.	1942–1945
J.R. Oliver, S.J.	1946–1949
Rev. Father C.N. Rushman	1952-1953
Rev. Father Leo Burns	1953-1957
Rev. William J.C. Kearns	1957-1958

=== St. Joseph's School for Girls ===
Principal name	Years
Miss Lucy	? - September 1885
Miss Miller	1885–1910
Sister Louise Bonnet	1932
Sister Zoe St. James	1932–1938
Miss Chloe Laferriere	1938–1944
Miss Zoe St. James	1944–1951
Miss R. McIntyre	1951–1952
Miss A. Straine	1952–1955
Miss Madeline MacDonald	1955–1956
Miss A. Straine	1956–1957
Miss Annie M. Berrigan (Principal-Teacher)	1958–1960
Miss Madeleine MacDonald	1960–1964
Miss Louise Gattie (Principal-Teacher)	1961–1962
Miss Gleason (Supervisor)	1961–1962

== See also ==
- List of Canadian residential schools
