= Back Forty Mine =

Proposed open-pit mine in Michigan, US

Coordinates: 45.4514°N 87.8246°W

- Interactive map of Back Forty Mine
- Location: Stephenson, Michigan, United States
- Products: zinc and gold
- Type: open-pit
- Company: Gold Resource Corp.
- Website: goldresourcecorp.com/projects/back-forty-michigan-usa
- Acquired: 2021

The Back Forty Mine is a proposed open-pit metallic sulfide mine targeting gold and zinc deposits in Menominee County in the South Central part of Michigan's Upper Peninsula next to the Menominee River.

Aquila Resources submitted its first permit applications to the state of Michigan in 2015. The project was originally proposed as a 750-foot deep (230 m) open-pit mine on 83 acres (34 ha) to extract gold, zinc and other metals. An on-site processing mill will crush and refine minerals and ores through flotation, separation and the use of cyanide. The underground sulfide deposit, discovered in 2001, may also produce smaller volumes of copper, silver and lead. The five key permits needed for the project to begin are a mining permit, an air permit, a water discharge permit, a wetland permit and a dam safety permit. The state of Michigan issued a draft mine permit in 2016. The Wisconsin Department of Natural Resources said "The surface water discharge application meets the Wisconsin water quality standards" as, while not having permitting authority, Marinette County, Wisconsin is across the river from the project.

A major concern is the project's impact on the river and surrounding wetlands, which are vital to natural habitat, erosion protection and water quality. Under a 1984 agreement between the U.S. Environmental Protection Agency (EPA) and Michigan, the state took over issuance of dredge-and-fill permits for many of the state’s waterways, subject to the EPA’s oversight as preserved in the Clean Water Act. The EPA and the Michigan Department of Environmental Quality (MDEQ) raised concerns during their review about acidic mining wastes spilling into the river and surrounding waterways, which would then spill into the Lake Michigan. Sulfide ores exposed to air and water undergo chemical reactions that create sulfuric acid that harms water quality and is toxic to fish and smaller aquatic organisms. The river is one of the most important rivers in Michigan as a part of a system that drains more than 4,000 square miles (10,000 km^{2}) of the Upper Peninsula and northern Wisconsin. The mine would be separated from the river by only an earthen dam. The EPA found after a May 3, 2018 meeting with the company that the requirement to finalize plans with the State of Michigan and evaluate impacts prior to starting construction in wetlands had addressed the agency's concerns. The DEQ then had to approve or reject the wetlands, lakes and streams permit by June 6, 2018, or authority for the permit application would transfer to the U.S. Army Corps of Engineers. The DEQ met the deadline and issued the permit. The site, 50 miles (80 km) upstream from the mouth of the river, is within the Lower Menominee River. Designated as a Great Lakes Area of Concern under the 1987 Great Lakes Water Quality Agreement, it was delisted in 2020.

The air permit and a water discharge permit were approved but the wetland permit was denied in January 2021 by an administrative law judge who found the permit did not provide reliable identification of wetland impacts and that the application was incomplete. Gold Resource Corp. took over the project when it acquired Aquila Resources later in 2021. The Michigan Department of Natural Resources decided to renew the lease for the mine before it expired December 27, 2021. Upper Peninsula lawmakers expressed their appreciation for the renewal with the expectation that the project would provide hundreds of good-paying construction, mining and administrative jobs, as well as contributing greatly to the region’s economy. Gold Resource Corp. is redesigning the mine’s operational footprint by reducing the pit size and moving it further from the river to reduce the impact on wetlands.

The Menominee Indian Tribe opposes the mine as the area has archaeological indicators such as burial mounds, raised garden beds, and dance rings which tell the story of their culture within the river’s watershed. The area is also sacred to the tribe as the Great White Bear emerged from the mouth of the river and became the first Menominee. The Menominee River Walk, a three-day, 100-mile journey on foot (160 km) in 2016, expressed the concern of the Menominee Indian Tribe of Wisconsin and environmental groups for the potential impact of the mine on the riparian environment.

== See also ==
- Copper mining in Michigan
