= Debajehmujig Theatre Group =

First Nations theatre group in Ontario

The Debajehmujig Storytellers, also Debajehmujig Theatre Group, or informally Debaj, is a First Nations theatre group and multi-arts organization based in Wiikwemkoong First Nation on Manitoulin Island in Northern Ontario. Debaj is the longest running Indigenous theatre in North America.

== History ==
Debajehmujig is from the Ojibwe (debaajimoojig) and Cree (tepācimūcik), both meaning "storytellers". Debajehmujig was founded by Shirley Cheechoo, Blake Debassige and colleagues in 1984 in M'Chigeeng First Nation (formerly known as West Bay) on Manitoulin Island. In 1989, the company moved to Wikwemikong Indian Reserve. In addition to being located in Wiikwemkoong, the company operates the Debajehmujig Creation Centre in Manitowaning. The main stage is the open air stage in the ruins of the Holy Cross Mission in Wiikwemkoong. The company plays throughout Canada under its Outreach program. The company was established so that "Native youth be given the opportunity to see themselves and their lives reflected on the stage, in the characters, in the stories, in the experiences portrayed."

== See also ==
- Holy Cross Church, Wikwemikong

== Notable alumni ==
- Shirley Cheechoo — founder, actor, playwright, artistic director, board member
- Tomson Highway — playwright, actor, artistic director (1984/85)
- Rene Highway — actor
- Drew Hayden Taylor — actor, playwright
