= Killarney, Ontario =

Killarney Shebahonaning
- Municipality
- Municipality of Killarney
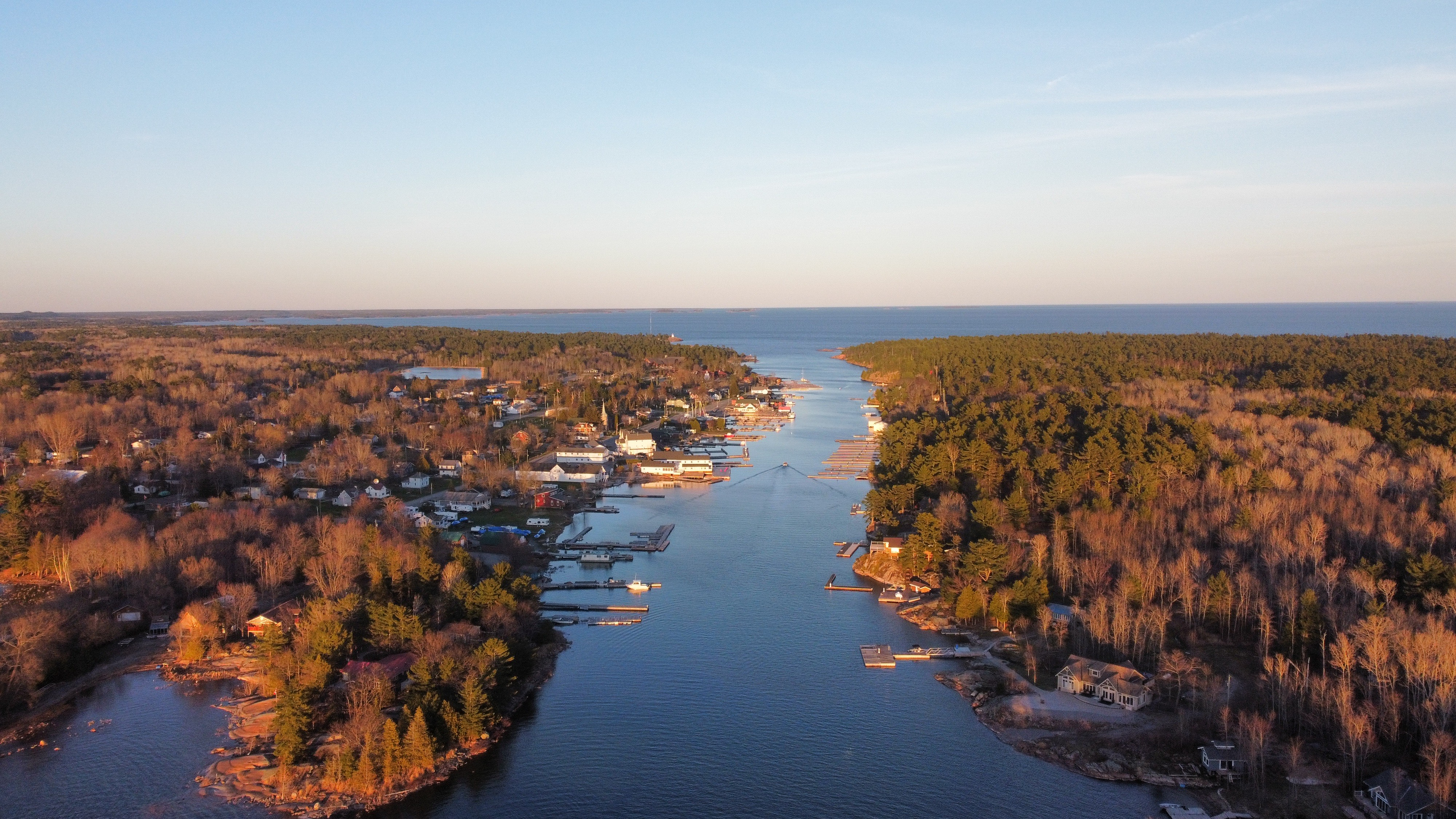
- Killarney Ontario in the Spring

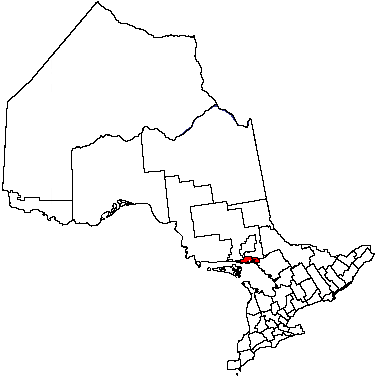
- Coordinates: 45°59′N 81°31′W
- Country: Canada
- Province: Ontario
- District: Sudbury
- Town founded: 1820
- Incorporated: January 1, 1999
- Founder: Etienne De La Morandière and his wife Josephte Sai-Sai-Go-No-Kwe

Government
  - Type: Municipality
  - Governing Body: Killarney Municipal Council
  - Mayor: Michael Reider
  - Councilors: Ward 1: Robert Campbell, Dave Froats and Peggy Roque; Ward 2: Nicola Grubic and Mary Bradbury
  - MP: Jim Belanger (Conservative)

Area
  - Land: 1,469.40 km^{2} (567.34 sq mi)

Population (2021)
  - Total: 397
  - Density: 0.3/km^{2} (0.78/sq mi)
- Time zone: UTC-5 (EST)
  - Summer (DST): UTC-4 (EDT)
- Postal code of Canada: P0M 2A0
- Area code: 705
- Website: www.municipalityofkillarney.ca

Killarney is a municipality located on the northern shore of Georgian Bay in the Sudbury District of Ontario, Canada. Killarney is commonly associated with Killarney Provincial Park, which is a large wilderness park located to the east of the townsite which occupies much of the municipality's expanded boundary.

In addition to the community of Killarney itself, the communities of Hartley Bay and Bigwood, and the ghost towns of French River, Collins Inlet, and Key Harbour, are also located within the municipal boundaries. The eastern end of the La Cloche Mountain Range is also located within the municipality of Killarney.

== History ==
Killarney's established community was founded in 1820 by Étienne De La Morandière (although indigenous peoples were living there prior), a French Canadian originally from Varennes, Quebec and a fur trader in Sault Ste Marie, Michigan, along with his wife Josette Sai Sai Go No Kwe, an indigenous woman from Michigan and a close relative of Chief Kitchi, meaning Big Gun. Soon after the arrival of the De La Morandières, many French-Canadian families started to settle in Killarney, starting many fishing businesses in the process. Although there was already an existing settlement here at that time, they are credited with the founding of the settlement.

The population increased when the logging industry took off in Colins Inlet in the late 1800s. Hundreds of people from around Ontario went to Colins Inlet for work and established a large community in the area. The logging industry collapsed in the early 1900s because of the low demand and the population declined. Remains of the large village can be seen across from the present-day Mill Lake lodge.

In 1929, the place was originally incorporated as the Township of Rutherford and George Island.

Another key industry that had a major impact on Killarney's economy was the fishing industry. There were many fishing companies in Killarney including C.W.L (Charles William Low), The Nobles, Charles Low/Joseph Roque partnership, and Albert Lowe. The collapse of the fishing industry at the end of the 1950s affected many families in Killarney including the Low, Roque, Jackman, Proulx, and Herbert families. Recreational fishing was also an industry. A fishing camp was run by the Fruehauf Trailer Company out of Detroit, Michigan. Roy Fruehauf, president of the company from 1949 to 1961, was primarily responsible for operating Killarney Mountain Lodge. Clients and guests would be flown in via Mallard sea planes for vacations during the warmer summer months.

A quarry in Killarney Bay had fixed this issue for many families by creating more employment opportunities in the area. The quarry is located on the westside of the Landsdowne channel and had been very financially efficient after the downfall of the fishing industry.The quarry eventually was shut down in 2016 over a labour dispute and the industry that replaced it was tourism.

The major tourism businesses in Killarney were the Killarney mountain lodge, the Sportsmans Inn, the Killarney Bay Inn, the Pines Inn, Herbert fisheries, and Pitfield's General Store. The booming tourism industry brought hundreds of thousands of dollars to the businesses of Killarney as well as the many families that contributed to it.

When and why the place name Shebahonaning was changed to Killarney is unknown. Lady Dufferin, wife of the Governor-General of Canada, has often been credited with the name change, but the passage in her journal which describes their stop in Killarney is dated 1874—almost twenty years after the Post Office had replaced the Shebahonaning postal stamp with one reading Killarney.

In July 1962, Highway 637 was established, connecting Killarney to major highways like Highway 69 and Highway 17, making it easier for people to travel to major cities like Toronto or Sudbury. Before that, the people of the town had to either go by boat in the summer to Little Current and then take a train to Sudbury or other areas to obtain food and resources or by horse and buggy in the winter.

On January 1, 1999, the Ontario provincial government merged the Township of Rutherford and George Island (having an area of 31.6 km^{2}, 12.2 sq mi in the 1996 census) with large tracts of surrounding unincorporated areas, forming the new Municipality of Killarney (with an area of 1,513.30 km^{2}, 584.29 sq mi in 2001 census). The municipality was also transferred from the Manitoulin District to the Sudbury District at that time. In 2006, the municipality was enlarged again (to 1,654.58 km^{2}, 638.84 sq mi) when it annexed the unorganized mainland portion of Manitoulin District. By the 2021 census, its territory was reduced to 1,469.40 km^{2} (567.34 sq mi) due to the incorporation of Point Grondine 3 reserve.

== Geography ==
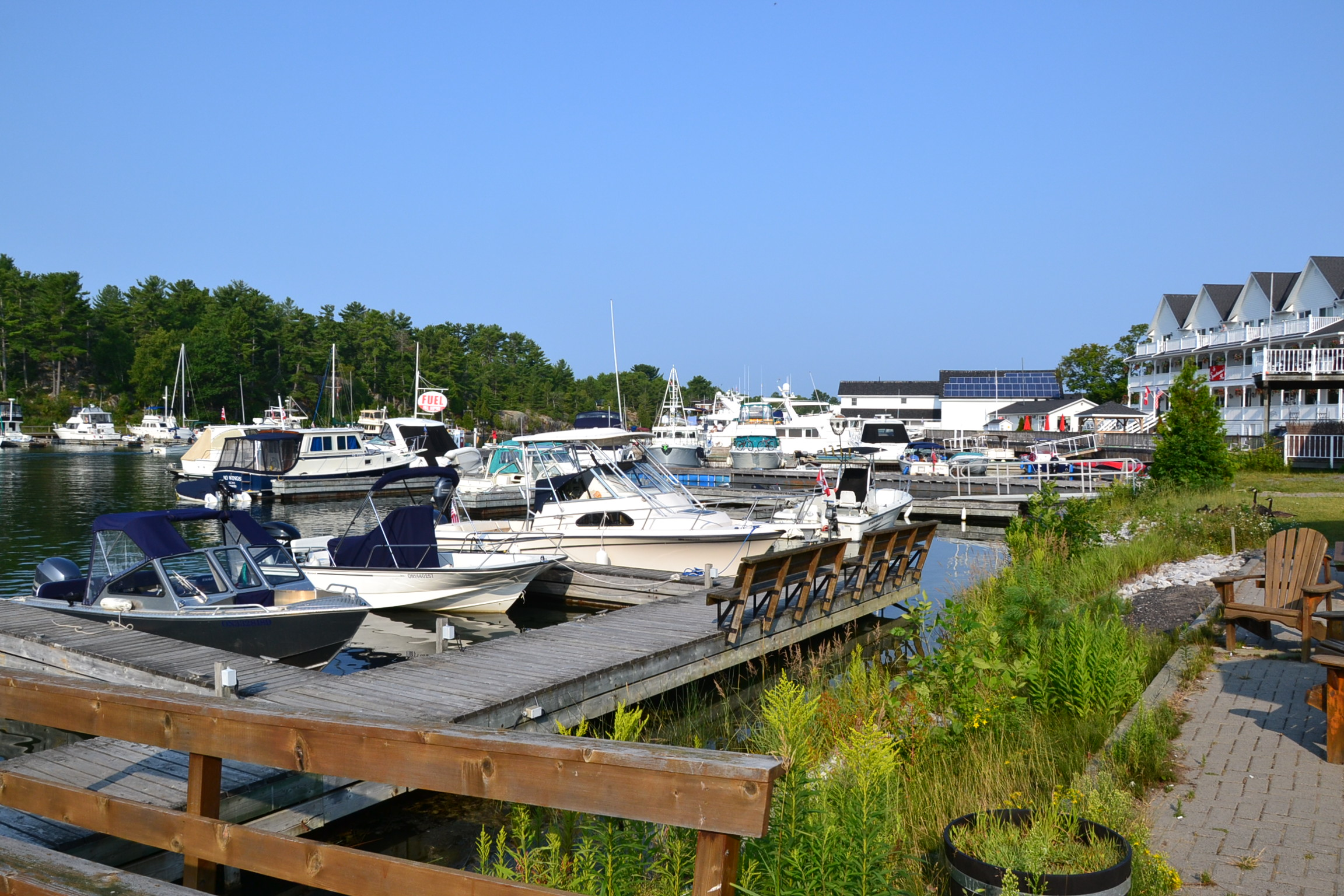
The Killarney Channel from the view of Gateway Marina

The larger municipality of Killarney now encompasses virtually all of Killarney Provincial Park and the French River delta, and extends all the way to Highway 69, over 70 kilometres (43 mi) from the townsite. Despite the municipality's geographic size, most of its population continues to reside in the community of Killarney itself, although smaller settlements also exist at Hartley Bay and Bigwood.

=== Climate ===
Climate data for Killarney, Ontario (1991−2020 normals, extremes 1992–2020)
Month	Jan	Feb	Mar	Apr	May	Jun	Jul	Aug	Sep	Oct	Nov	Dec	Year
Record high °C (°F)	8.2 (46.8)	9.1 (48.4)	16.3 (61.3)	22.5 (72.5)	27.0 (80.6)	29.5 (85.1)	32.1 (89.8)	30.8 (87.4)	28.1 (82.6)	22.8 (73.0)	17.2 (63.0)	12.7 (54.9)	32.1 (89.8)
Mean daily maximum °C (°F)	−4.8 (23.4)	−3.8 (25.2)	0.7 (33.3)	7.0 (44.6)	13.8 (56.8)	19.2 (66.6)	22.4 (72.3)	21.6 (70.9)	18.1 (64.6)	11.4 (52.5)	5.2 (41.4)	−0.9 (30.4)	9.2 (48.6)
Daily mean °C (°F)	−8.8 (16.2)	−8.1 (17.4)	−3.2 (26.2)	3.6 (38.5)	10.3 (50.5)	16.0 (60.8)	19.2 (66.6)	18.6 (65.5)	15.0 (59.0)	8.5 (47.3)	2.3 (36.1)	−4.3 (24.3)	5.8 (42.4)
Mean daily minimum °C (°F)	−12.9 (8.8)	−12.3 (9.9)	−7.0 (19.4)	0.1 (32.2)	6.8 (44.2)	12.8 (55.0)	16.1 (61.0)	15.6 (60.1)	12.0 (53.6)	5.5 (41.9)	−0.8 (30.6)	−7.7 (18.1)	2.3 (36.1)
Record low °C (°F)	−33.9 (−29.0)	−29.5 (−21.1)	−28.3 (−18.9)	−13.6 (7.5)	−3 (27)	4.5 (40.1)	7.4 (45.3)	8.1 (46.6)	0.3 (32.5)	−6.8 (19.8)	−17.3 (0.9)	−27.8 (−18.0)	−33.9 (−29.0)
Average relative humidity (%) (at 15:00)	67.4	63.3	58.0	58.9	63.0	66.7	66.4	67.4	67.2	66.4	69.0	70.9	65.4
Source: Environment and Climate Change Canada

== Demographics ==
In the 2021 Census of Population conducted by Statistics Canada, Killarney had a population of 397 living in 193 of its 443 total private dwellings, a change of 2.8% from its 2016 population of 386. With a land area of 1,469.4 km^{2} (567.3 sq mi), it had a population density of 0.3/km^{2} (0.7/sq mi) in 2021.

Canada census – Killarney community profile

	2021	2016	2011
Population	397 (+2.8% from 2016)	386 (-23.6% from 2011)	505 (+11.2% from 2006)
Land area	1,469.40 km^{2} (567.34 sq mi)	1,653.32 km^{2} (638.35 sq mi)	1,654.58 km^{2} (638.84 sq mi)
Population density	0.3/km^{2} (0.78/sq mi)	0.2/km^{2} (0.52/sq mi)	0.3/km^{2} (0.78/sq mi)
Median age	60.0 (M: 60.0, F: 61.6)	57.3 (M: 57.9, F: 56.5)
Private dwellings	443 (total) 193 (occupied)	388 (total)	400 (total)
Median household income	$74,000	$58,368

References: 2021 2016 2011

Historical census populations – Killarney, Ontario

Year	Pop.	±%
1921	329	—
1931	319	−3.0%
1941	439	+37.6%
1951	429	−2.3%
1956	495	+15.4%
1961	484	−2.2%

Year	Pop.	±%
1966	448	−7.4%
1971	496	+10.7%
1976	465	−6.2%
1981	446	−4.1%
1986	447	+0.2%
1991	425	−4.9%

Year	Pop.	±%
1996	401	−5.6%
2001	428	+6.7%
2006	454	+6.1%
2011	505	+11.2%
2016	386	−23.6%
2021	397	+2.8%

Population counts prior to 1999 are for Rutherford and George Island Township. Population counts are not adjusted for boundary changes.
Source: Statistics Canada

== Economy ==
The Killarney area economy is based primarily on tourism, consisting mainly of wilderness lodges, campgrounds, and retail services geared towards campers and other visitors to Killarney.

A community museum, the Killarney Centennial Museum, is located in Killarney across the municipal offices.

=== Fishing industry ===
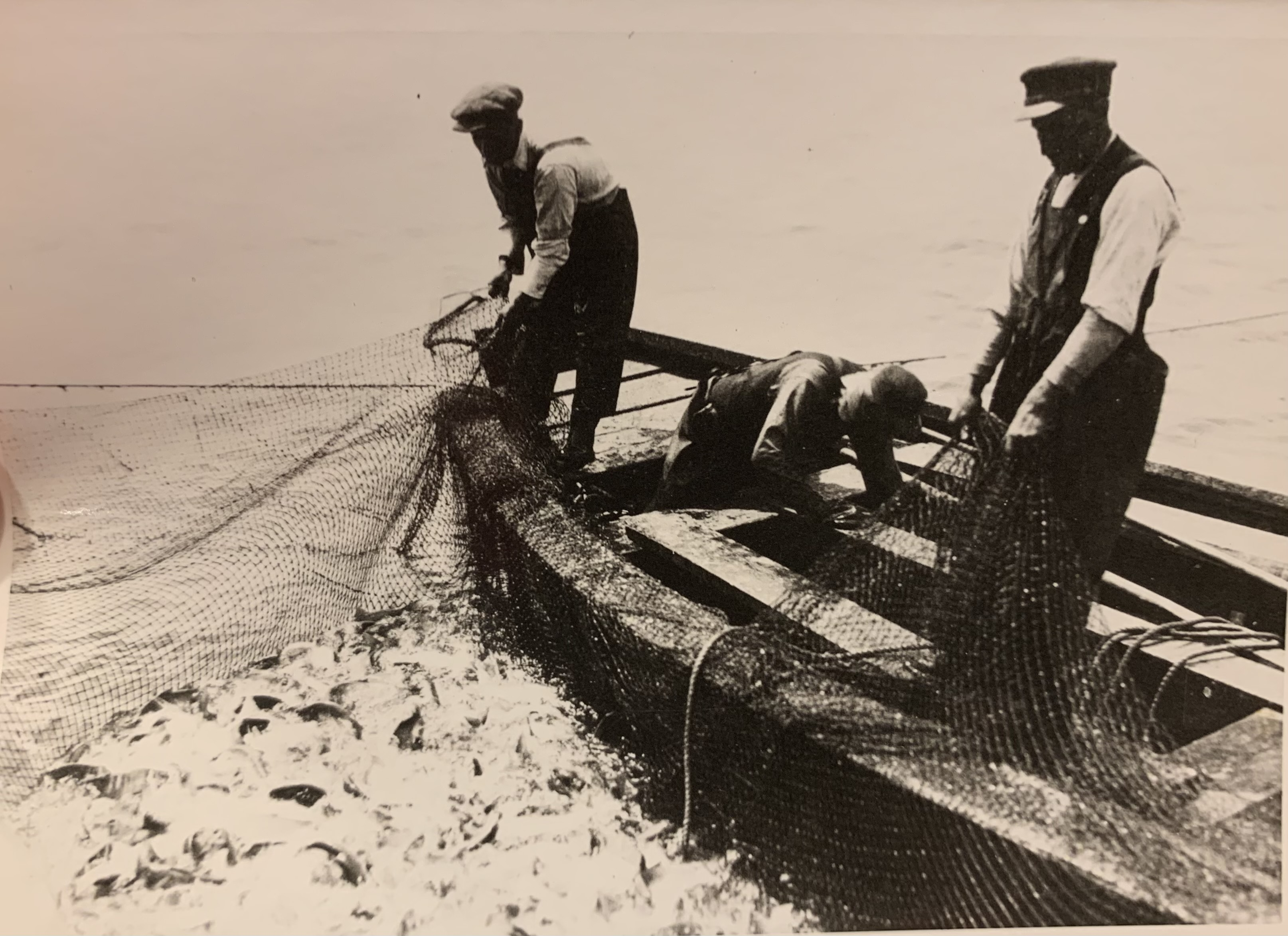
Fishing in Killarney using pound nets.

There were many fishing companies in Killarney, including C.W.L. (Charles William Low), the Nobles, Charles Low Joseph Roque partnership, and Albert Lowe. Most of these people at some point worked together in Killarney to sustain the fishing needs of the community. The main difference between the many different fishing businesses in Killarney was how they fished. Many fishing families and businesses in town built fishing outposts in the area of Georgian Bay surrounding the village of Killarney. The collapse of the fishing industry at the end of the 1950s affected many families in Killarney including the low, Roques, Jackman, Proulx, and Herbert families. The collapse caused many families of Killarney to either go broke or have to look into other means of employment in order to support their families.

== Government ==
The Mayor of Killarney is Michael Reider, and the councillors are Ward 1: Rob Campbell, Dave Froats, and Peggy Roque Ward 2: Mary Bradbury and Nicola Grubic.

Although not officially part of the Sudbury East region, Killarney participates in the regional Sudbury East Planning Board with the municipalities of French River, St. Charles and Markstay-Warren.

List of mayors of Killarney:

- Laurier Low: 1999-2006
- Morgan Pitfield: 2006-2014
- Ginny Rook: 2014-2020
- Nancy Wirtz: 2020-2022
- Michael Reider: 2022 (incumbent)

== Tourism ==
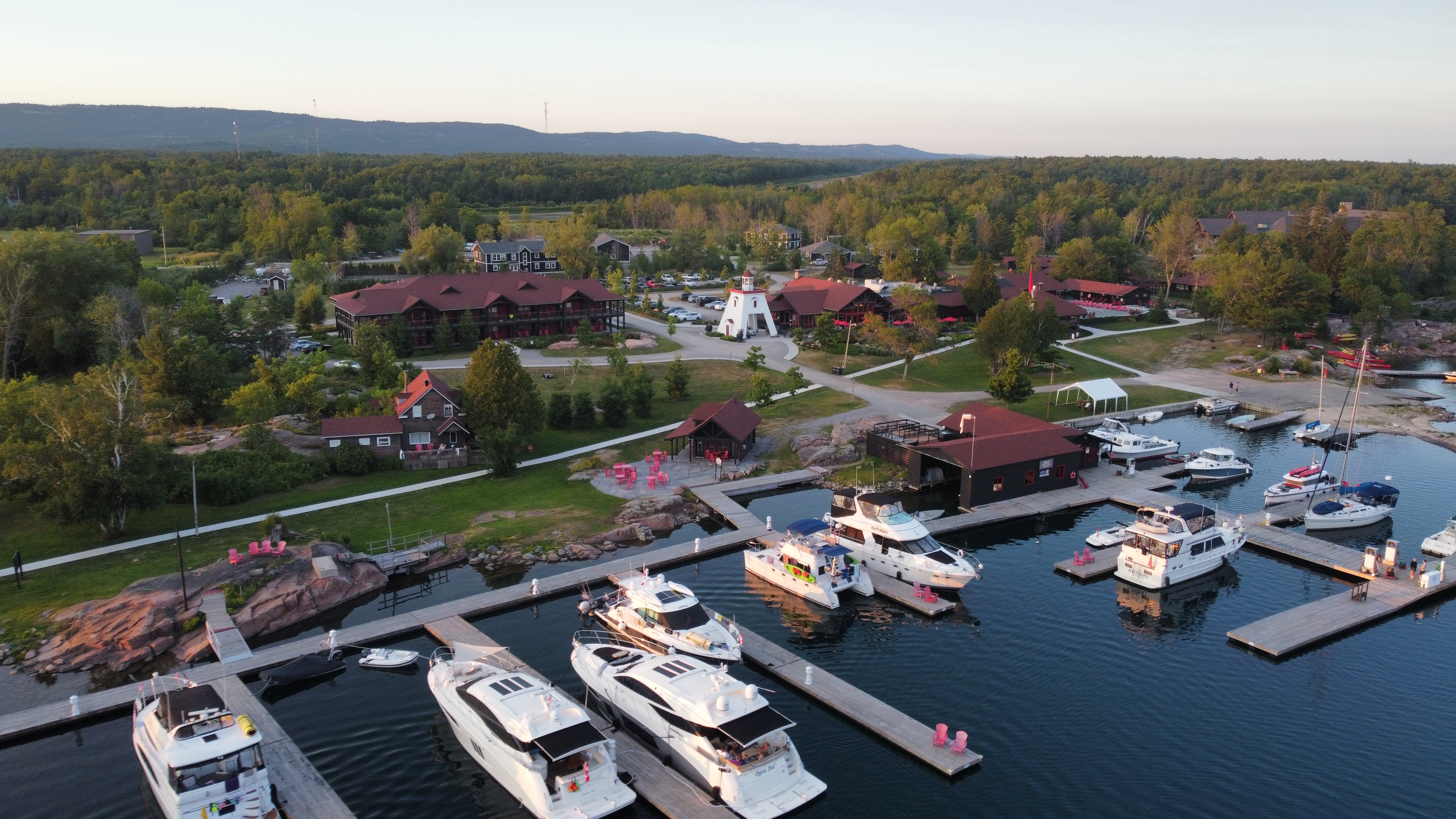
The Killarney Mountain Lodge 2022

One tourism website listed 21 things to do in the area although much of the contest related to provincial parks.

There are also three campgrounds in Killarney, Killarney Provincial Park, Roche Rouge campground, and Roque's Marina.There are two places to stay overnight in Killarney the Killarney Mountain Lodge and the Sportsman's inn which are sister resorts. Guests from either one can use the amenities of both.

Although not officially part of the Sudbury east region, Killarney participates in the regional Sudbury East planning board with the municipalities of French River St Charles and Markstay Warren.

== Attractions ==
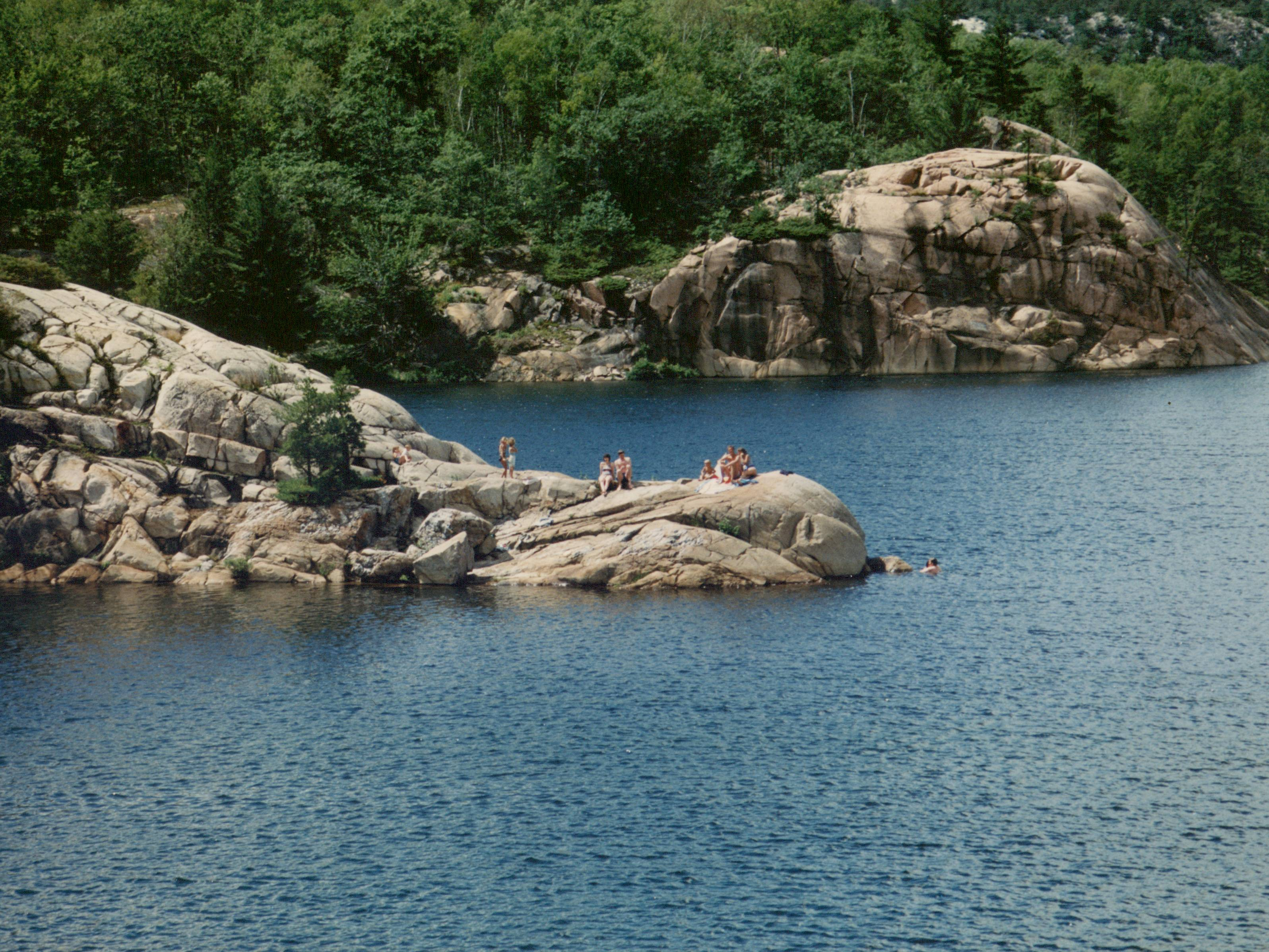
"Turtle rock"s on George Lake in Killarney Provincial Park

- Killarney Provincial Park
- Killarney Provincial Park Observatory
- Killarney Centennial Museum
- Point Grondine Park

== Infrastructure ==
=== Transportation ===
Killarney is accessible from Highway 637, which is the only highway in and out. Killarney Airport is located in the municipality. Killarney is also frequently visited by boat.

== See also ==
- List of townships in Ontario
