= Shirley Cheechoo =

Canadian film director

Shirley Cheechoo CM
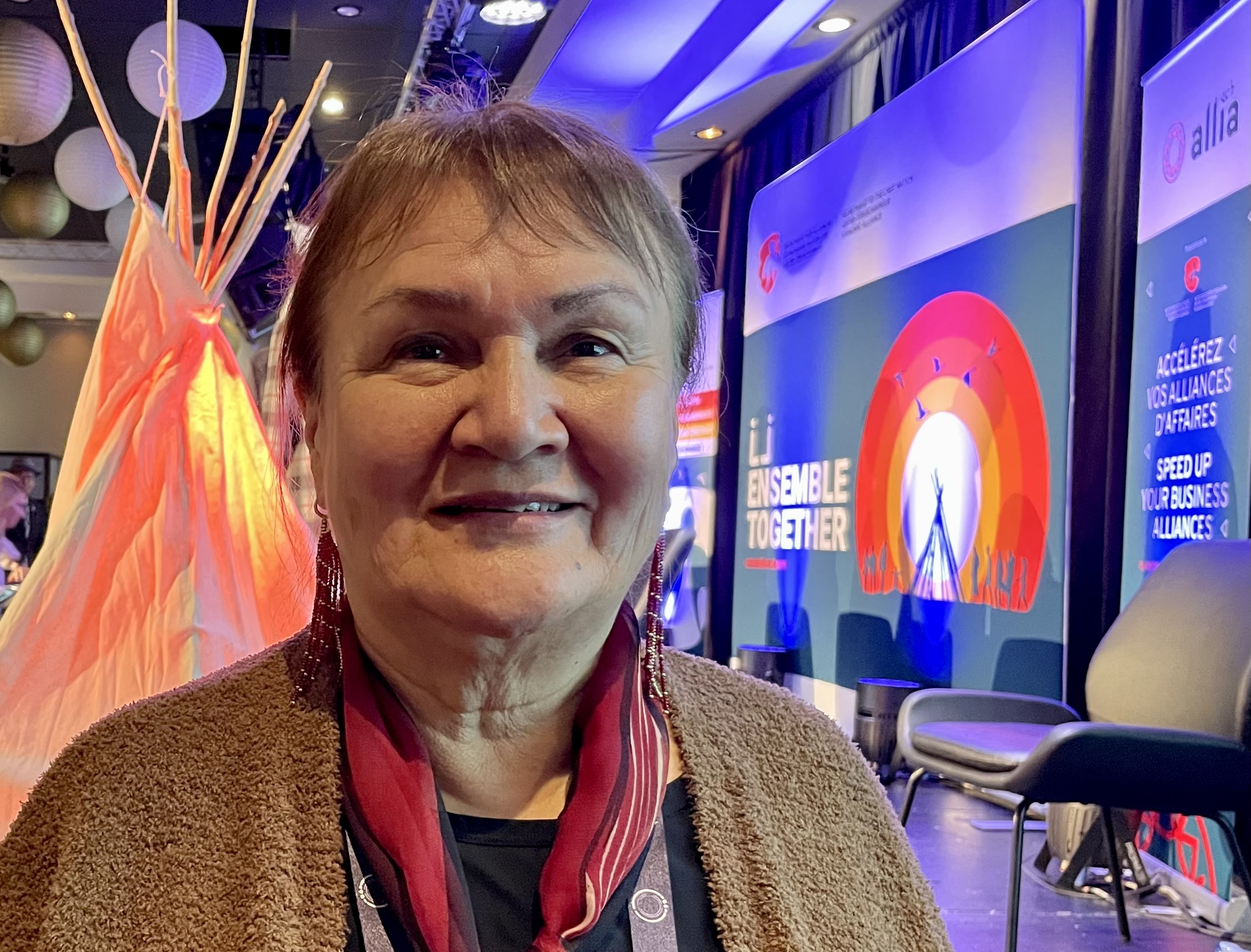
- Cheechoo in 2022
- Born: 1952 (age 73–74); Eastmain, Quebec, Canada
- Occupations: Actor, writer, producer, director & visual artist, chancellor
- Spouse: Blake Debassige

Shirley Cheechoo CM (Cree: ᔒᓕᒋᒍ; born 1952) is a Canadian Cree actress, writer, producer, director, and visual artist, best known for her solo-voice or monodrama play Path With No Moccasins, as well as her work with De-Ba-Jeh-Mu-Jig theatre group. Her first break came in 1985 when she was cast on the CBC's first nations TV series Spirit Bay, and later, in 1997, she found a role on the CBC's TV series The Rez.

She was named chancellor of Brock University in July 2015, the institution's first female and first aboriginal chancellor. She held the position to 2020.

== Biography ==
Shirley Cheechoo was born in 1952 in Eastmain, Quebec, and grew up in Moose Factory and Hearst, Ontario. Shirley spent her early life on traplines with her parents and brothers, but at the age of nine was sent to a residential school, Shingwauk Indian Residential School. At this school Cheechoo, like many other residential school survivors, experienced violence and abuse and was told that "her parents would die if she ran away." After leaving school at fifteen, Cheechoo experienced problems with substance abuse, but eventually, she turned her life around and began to work in film and theatre to explore themes of healing and survivance post-trauma. Her experiences at a residential school and her road to healing are documented in her stage play 1991 Path with No Moccasins.

Shirley attended art classes at the Manitou Arts Foundation during the summer of 1970.

== The De-ba-jeh-mu-jig years ==
Shirley founded De-ba-jeh-mu-jig theatre, which developed out of the children's theatre. After starting the theatre company, partner Blake Debassige, a visual artist, served on the board of directors and as president of the board during the early years of De-Ba-Jeh-Mu-Jig theatre group.

During her time at Debaj, Shirley fulfilled the role of artistic director, president of the board of directors, as well as fulfilling much of the administrative roles, actor, and playwright.

Shirley is the first First Nations woman to "write, produce, direct, and act in a feature length film from Canada".

== Career ==
Shirley first gained national attention with Path With No Moccasins. Her directorial debut was with a short film called Silent Tears, which won several film festival awards for Best Short Film and was "screened at the 1998Sundance Film Festival."

Her first feature film was Backroads, a journey into the harsh contemporary life of Cree women. The movie was financed and executive-produced by Offline Entertainment Group.

Shirley realized that she could "ease a pain or raise an issue with her film work" and so dedicated herself to creating film by enrolling in writing classes, director's labs, acting workshops and film schools.

Much of her art is based on biographical elements. Path With No Moccasins gave Shirley the opportunity to "speak about her life and the struggle to retain her identity, and Cree heritage". Silent Tears chronicles the events of a "harsh winter trip with her parents to a northern trap line when she was eight years old".

In order to promote Aboriginal artists, Shirley and Blake Debassige co-own Kasheese Studios art gallery. She is also the president of Spoken Song film production company and founded the Weengushk Film Institute on Manitoulin Island that will train, develop and guide independent filmmakers. Through the Weengushk Film Institute, she also launched the annual Weengushk International Film Festival in 2018.

Her artwork is inspired by Woodlands School, which is a concept given birth by Norval Morrisseau. Her art has been exhibited around the world, and her commissions include:

- Christmas cards for UNICEF
- Amnesty International
- The Ontario Native Women's Association
- The Hospital for Sick Children, Toronto

== Cultural work ==
She is a mentor to many in the Native arts community and one of Canada's most well-known and respected artists. She visits other communities and schools and holds workshops. On the topic of visiting schools to host acting and playwrighting workshops, Shirley has said

the kids that come into the theatre, into the drama workshops, are the kids that I pick. I feel that they need some kind of self-esteem, and drama does it. Anything in the arts gives these kids a lot of self-esteem ... the arts are really important for children and they're not taught in the schools

Shirley is concerned with Indigenous people's complacency with "small advancements and the slight changes that appear when it comes to equality and respect" and believes that "We must continue to fight in the most positive way to try and find a level playing field for Indigenous people to work, live, and create in the main".

In February 2008, Shirley was awarded a Lifetime Achievement Award in the area of art by the National Aboriginal Achievement Foundation. She was also awarded the Queen's Diamond Jubilee Award in 2013 to recognize her commitment to education. She also received the Anishinabek Nation Lifetime Achievement Award in 2019.

== Writings and appearances ==
=== Plays ===
- Path With No Moccasins (1991)
- Tangled Sheets (1994)
- Your Dream Was Mine (2005)

=== Film ===
Shirley Cheechoo's films
Year	Title	Director	Writer	Ref.
	Shadows in Deep Water	Yes	No	
1998	Silent Tears	Yes	Yes	
2000	Backroads; Also known as Bearwalker	Yes	Yes	
2001	Tracks in the Snow	Yes	No	
2003	Pikutiskaau (Mother Earth)	Yes	No	
2003	In Shadow	Yes	No	
2005	Johnny Tootall	Yes	Yes	
2013	Moose River Crossing	Yes	Yes	

Narrator

- Utshimassits: Place of the Boss (1996)

=== Media appearances ===
- Spirit Bay (1984)
- Medicine River (1993)
- The Rez (1996)
- Song of Hiawatha (1997)
- Silent Tears (1998)
- Johnny Greyeyes (2000)
- Backroads (2000)
- Christmas in the Clouds (2001)
- MVP - Mrs. Lemonde (2008)
- Provided the illustrations for Tales the Elders Told by Basil H. Johnston

== Awards ==
- Best Short Film - Silent Tears
- Telefilm Canada/Television Northern Canada Award for Best Canadian Aboriginal Language Television Program - Silent Tears (1998)
- Best Director. Reel World Film Festival (Toronto 2000)
- Lifetime Achievement Award in the area of art (2008). Given by the National Aboriginal Achievement Foundation, now Indspire.
- CTV Fellowship Award
- Eagle Spirit Award
- Independent Filmmaker of the Year (Arizona International Film Festival) (2002).
- Best Film for Johnny Tootall at the 2005 American Indian Film Festival.

== See also ==
- Medicine Woman - Television show directed by Shirley Cheechoo.
