= Mother Earth Water Walk =

Canadian environmental group

Mother Earth Water Walk is an Anishinaabe-led initiative dedicated to raising awareness about the importance of water and the need for protection of water. Organizers and participants have walked around bodies of water since 2003 as a way of taking action against water pollution.

== History ==
In 2003 Anishinaabe grandmothers, including Grandmother Josephine Mandamin, along with many Anishinaabe women and men, began walking around the Great Lakes on Turtle Island. They came together to raise awareness about society's negligence towards water.

In 2011 a Health Canada study found that 122 First Nation communities were under water advisories. The rising need for water preservation and clean water inspired a much larger water walk to take place in 2011. The 2011 Mother Earth Water Walk involved walks collecting water from the Pacific Ocean, the Atlantic Ocean, Lake Superior, Hudson River and the Gulf of Mexico. Water from the four directions and four bodies of water was walked to Bad River, Wisconsin and mixed with Lake Superior waters during a ceremony on June 12, 2011.

Since its conception Mother Earth Water Walkers have walked over 10,000 miles along the shores of bodies of Water in Canada, Central America, and the United States. In 2016 Josephine Mandamin, founder of the Mother Earth Water Walk, was awarded the Lieutenant Governor's Ontario Heritage Award for her work raising awareness about water conservation and the dangers of fracking, pollution, and the bottled water industry.

== Past walks ==
Mother Earth Water Walkers have traveled around numerous bodies of water to raise awareness about the need for water preservation. Walks have included:

- Lake Superior (2003)
- Lake Michigan (2004, 2008)
- Lake Huron (2005)
- Lake Ontario (2006)
- Lake Erie (2007)
- St. Lawrence River (2009)
- Four Directions Water Walk (2011)
- Lake Monona (2012)
- Lake Nipigon (2012)
- Lake Winnebago (2015)
- Sacred Walk (2015)
- Menominee River (2016)

== Walks inspired by the Mother Earth Water Walks ==
- Lake Winnipeg

== Awards ==
- Excellence in Conservation, Ontario Heritage Trust, February 26, 2016
- 2015 Lieutenant Governor's Ontario Heritage Award
- October 2015, George R. Richardson Conservation Award of Honour
- Lake Superior Magazine 2011 Achievement Award
- Outstanding Achievement Award Winner, Earth Ball 2016
- Honouring Grandmother Josephine Mandamin 2017
- Diamond Jubilee Medal 2012
