= Anaem Omot =

- U.S. National Register of Historic Places
- Interactive map
- Location: Lake and Holmes vicinity, Menominee County, Michigan and Wausaukee vicinity, Marinette County, Wisconsin
- Coordinates: 45°28′00″N 87°49′00″W
- Built: 1,000 A.D.
- NRHP reference No.: 100009086
- Added to NRHP: June 20, 2023

Anaem Omot ("Dog's Belly") is the Menominee name for the Sixty Islands archaeological site, a five-square-mile area located on both sides of the Menominee River, forming the Michigan and Wisconsin border. It is the ancestral home of the Menominee Nation. It is an important archaeology site providing the most intact example of pre-European farming in Eastern North America. The boundaries of the Anaem Omot extends 500 feet (150 m) inland from the banks of the Menominee River, and runs from the Chalk Hills Dam to the Pike River. The area is part of a land dispute between the Menominee and an open-pit mining proposal.

== History ==
The name Anaem Omot ("Dogs Belly") relates to a Menominee legend involving otters at play in the Menominee River that were mistaken for dogs.

Archaeologists have found evidence for humans living at Anaem Omot dating to as far back as 8,000 B.C.. Archaeological remains include multiple burial mounds, some looted as recently as the 1970s. A number of circle dance features, where the ancestors of the Menominee performed "dream dances", introduced by the Ojibwe in the 19th century. A tribal village on the Wisconsin side of the river that was occupied in the 17th through 19th centuries. There is the foundation of a colonial-era trading post; and two 19th-century logging camps.

A distinct feature throughout the landscape is a raised ridge field system once used to cultivate corn, climbing beans and winter squash. For a 600-year period from A.D. 1000 to 1600, the site was intensively farmed. The landscape largely escaped 19th and 20th century disturbances. Raised crop bed ridges are still clearly visible. It is the most complete pre-European farming site still existing in eastern North America.

Agricultural features like this were probably once common throughout North America challenging existing theories about ancient agriculture. According to a 2025 paper published in Science by Madeleine McLeester of Dartmouth College, "traditionally, intensive farming in ancient times has been thought to be mostly limited to societies that had centralized power, large populations and a hierarchical structure," such as in Central America and places along the Mississippi River. None of this was the case at Omot. Plots were tended by individual growers who lived on the site seasonally in an egalitarian society. They also developed technologies and practices that kept fields continually fertile for hundreds of years. "That forces us to reconsider a number of preconceived ideas we have about agriculture not only in the region, but globally," according to McLeester.

== Open-pit mine ==
A portion of the area overlaps with Back Forty Mine, a proposed open-pit gold mine. The mine would not directly impact cultural features within Anaem Omot, according to the mine owners Gold Resources Corporation (GRC), but among detractors there is concern that it could pollute the river and change the natural environment. An investigation in 2025 found a burial mount and ancient agricultural ridges are located on the land owned by GRC and that is within Anaem Omot.

In June 2023, the National Park Service added the site to the National Register of Historic Places following a contentious multi-year nomination process that was supported by both the states of Michigan and Wisconsin; it was opposed by GRC and some local county lawmakers. According to an historic preservation law attorney, the NRHP listing on its own affords "zero protection" from development - there are nearly 100 private owners of the land that makes up Anaem Omot. Nevertheless, NRHP is a step towards applying for historic district status, a designation that could provide legal protection from development.

== See also ==
- Eastern Agricultural Complex
