= Autumn Peltier =

Canadian Indigenous rights advocate (born 2004)

- Born: September 27, 2004 (age 22); Manitoulin, Ontario, Canada
- Occupation: Activist for Indigenous rights
- Years active: 2018–present
- Known for: Water advocacy, environmental activism, Indigenous rights
- Title: Chief Water Commissioner

Autumn Peltier (born September 27, 2004) is an Anishinaabe Indigenous rights advocate from the Wikwemkong First Nation on Manitoulin Island. She was named Chief Water Commissioner for the Anishinabek Nation in 2019. In 2018, at the age of thirteen, Peltier addressed world leaders at the United Nations General Assembly on the issue of water protection.

== Early life ==
Peltier was born and raised on Wiikwemkong First Nation on Manitoulin Island, Ontario, Canada. She attended St. Mother Teresa High School and currently lives in Ottawa. At the age of eight, Peltier began attending water ceremonies on First Nation. At one ceremony in Serpent River First Nation in Ontario, she witnessed warning signs of "toxic" drinking water, caused by factors such as pipeline leaks and pollution. When her mother informed her of the 20-year boil-water advisory in the community, Peltier was shocked. This experience served as a catalyst for Peltier's work, and she began partaking in water ceremonies across Ontario.

Peltier was influenced by her great-aunt Josephine Mandamin, an activist for clean water and the previous Chief Water Protector for the Anishinaabek Nation, a title awarded to Peltier after Mandamin's death in 2019.

== Positions on water conservation ==
Peltier is a strong believer in the role of women in water advocacy, explaining that the first two teachings all humans experience when in the womb are to love the water and to love one's mother. Thus, according to Peltier, women are truly connected to water in a spiritual way, as the nine months of carrying a baby is believed to be a ceremony.

Peltier also believes strongly in the power of young people to create change. She supports the advocacy of other youth to collectively effect change, as youth will make future decisions for their countries. She expressed frustration at how young people must "[pay] for the mistakes that older people made". Despite this frustration, she describes feeling good about her own work and other young people stepping up to take action. Peltier worked closely with the Dreamcatcher Charitable Foundation to provide short-term water access relief to over 500 homes across First Nations communities (as of November 23, 2022). Their on-going partnership is considered to be one of the largest humanitarian relief efforts across First Nations Indigenous communities that is not supported nor at all funded by the Canadian Government.

One major facet of Peltier's work is her environmental justice activism. She has discussed the challenges of environmental racism against First Nations communities in Canada in the context of water rights. Peltier has argued that the demands of Indigenous peoples in Canada are consistently ignored and minimized by virtue of their indigeneity. Peltier has drawn attention to disparities in treatment of Indigenous people in Canada relative to non-indigenous Canadians, comparing the experience of First Nations citizens (who often face police brutality, political repression, and racism), with that of white Canadians living in remote communities, who are never denied access to water.

== Water advocacy and impact ==
At age 12, Peltier gained national and international notice at a 2016 meeting of the Assembly of First Nations when she presented Canadian Prime Minister Justin Trudeau with a copper water pot and, although she did not have time to deliver her prepared speech, confronted Trudeau on his record on water protection and his support for pipelines. She said:

"I'm very unhappy with the choices you made and broken promises to my people...I don't think he should have made that promise, because now I'm going to hold him accountable."

— Autumn Peltier, 2016

Upon reflecting on the confrontation with Prime Minister Trudeau in a 2020 interview, Peltier recalled how she questioned how the public could trust Prime Minister Trudeau considering his lackluster environmental record, highlighting the hypocrisy of Trudeau's authorization of the construction of the Kinder-Morgan pipeline (which was preceded by a significant oil spill in British Columbia).

Her act inspired the Assembly of First Nations to create the Niabi Odacidae fund. Peltier further gained attention when she spoke at the Global Landscapes Forum in New York City in September 2018, where she addressed the United Nations and important decision-makers. This conference also allowed Peltier to further spread awareness for her cause globally. Peltier was also invited to speak at the United Nation Secretary-General's Climate Action Summit in New York, in 2018 and 2019.

Peltier is active on various social media platforms and often is connected as a contributor across international broadcast networks and on-line platforms. She has over 200,000 followers across platforms, using them to spread awareness of indigenous inequalities and water advocacy issues, receiving support from youth, politicians, and other activists. She has brought attention to the absence of clean drinking water in Indigenous communities in Canada.

In April 2019, Peltier was named the chief water commissioner by the Anishinabek Nation. This position was previously held by her great-aunt, Josephine Mandamin, who died in 2019. At the time of her selection, current Anishinabek Nation Ground Council Chief Glen Hare explained that the decision was simple to make, as "Autumn has extensive nibi giikendaaswin (water knowledge). She has been bringing global attention to the water issues in our country for a few years now." In her role as Chief Water Commissioner, Peltier represents 39 First Nations in Ontario and is responsible for relaying community concerns to the Anishinabek Council.

In response to the COVID-19 pandemic, Peltier spoke up about the increased importance of clean water access as a public health issue for First Nations communities, where outbreaks have been particularly severe. Peltier believes that the response to the COVID-19 pandemic globally has paved a way for a response to the issue of the drinking water crisis for First Nations in Canada and is hopeful that change is possible.

On September 29, 2022, the eve of National Day for Truth and Reconciliation in Canada, Autumn Peltier's petition asking for clean water solutions was referenced in a Parliamentary House of Commons address. The petition has over 112,000 signatures.

== Awards and recognition ==
- Top 3 Finalist for The 2022 International Children's Peace Prize
- Nominated for the International Children's Peace Prize, 2017, 2018, 2019.
- Canadian Living Me to We Award Youth in Action under 12, 2017.
- Ontario Junior Citizens Award, Ontario Newspaper Association, 2017.
- Sovereign Medal of Exceptional Volunteerism, by Governor General of Canada and Lieutenant Governor Of Ontario, March 2017
- Ottawa Riverkeeper Award, 2018.
- Water Warrior Award at the Water Docs Film Festival in Toronto, 2019.
- Young Leader Award, Ontario Municipal Social Services Association Award, 2019.
- Named Top 30 under 30 in North America for Environmental Education making a difference, 2019.
- Named to the BBC 100 Women list for 2019.
- Named to Maclean's list of 20 to Watch in 2020.
- Named to Huffington Post's list of 15 Canadian Icons Who Stole our Hearts in 2019.
- Named to the Union of Concerned Scientists list of 2019 Science Defenders.
- Named as a Chatelaine 2019 Woman of the Year.
- "Planet in Focus" Rob Stewart Youth Eco-Hero, 2019.
- Feature in Short Documentary Film The Water Walker, 2020
- RevolutionHer Community Vision Youth Award, 2021
- Canada Walk of Fame, Community Hero Award, 2023
