= Leonard S. Mandamin =

Canadian judge

Federal Court of Canada
- Incumbent
- Assumed office April 27, 2007

Personal details
- Born: 1944 (age 81–82) Wikwemikong Unceded Reserve, Ontario

Leonard S. Mandamin (born 1944) is a judge who served from 2007 to 2019 on the Federal Court of Canada.
