= CarProof =

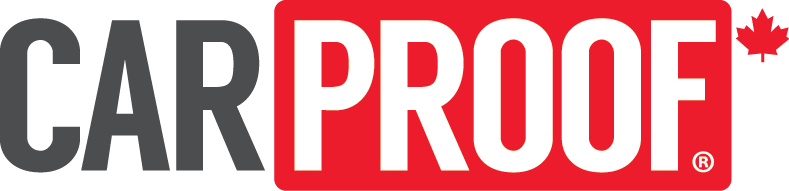
- Industry: Information Technology Services
- Founded: 2000
- Headquarters: London, Ontario, Canada
- Products: Vehicle history reports
- Website: www.carfax.ca

CarProof is a Canadian provider of vehicle history and valuation reports used by consumers and businesses when buying and selling pre-owned vehicles.

== History ==
CarProof was created in 2000 and is based in London, Ontario. Paul Antony, the company's co-founder, recognized through his experience running a car dealership that no service existed for a cross-Canada lien search on used cars. He, along with a team of founders, created CarProof to provide Canadians who are buying or selling used cars with accurate details about a vehicle's history as well as lien information. CarProof has since added vehicle valuation solutions to its product line. The company's president is Mark Rousseau. In December 2015, CarProof was purchased by IHS Inc for 650 million. On November 1, 2018, CarProof officially became CARFAX Canada.

== Awards ==
Year	Award
2009	Deloitte's Technology Fast 50
2010	Deloitte's Technology Fast 50
2011	Deloitte's Technology Fast 50[6]
2011	Deloitte's Technology Fast 500
2012	Canada's 50 Best Managed Companies
2012	London, Ontario's Large Business of the Year
2012	Deloitte's Technology Fast 50
2012	Deloitte's Technology Fast 500
2013	Canada's 50 Best Managed Companies
2013	Deloitte's Technology Fast 50
2013	Deloitte's Technology Fast 500
2014	Canada's 50 Best Managed Companies

== See also ==
- Used car
- Vehicle identification number
- Vehicle history report
- Car dealership
- Car auction
