= Point Grondine Park =

Indian reserve in Ontario, Canada

Point Grondine 3
- Indian reserve
- Point Grondine Indian Reserve No. 3
- Location within Ontario
- Coordinates: 46°01′N 81°09′W
- Country: Canada
- Province: Ontario
- District: Sudbury
- First Nation: Wiikwemkoong

Area
  - Land: 138.97 km^{2} (53.66 sq mi)

Point Grondine Park is a nature park on the northern shore of Lake Huron in Sudbury District, Ontario, owned by the Wiikwemkoong First Nation. It occupies the unpopulated historic Point Grondine 3 Indian reserve, which was created under the terms of the Robinson Huron Treaty in 1850.

The former Point Grondine First Nation abandoned the area in the 1940s, moving to the Wiikwemkoong territory on Manitoulin Island before fully amalgamating with the Wiikwemkoong band in 1968. The Point Grondine area then remained unoccupied and virtually unused by the band until the park was established in 2015. The park is the first phase in a planned Georgian Bay Coast Trail project, which will eventually see a 200-kilometre nature trail extending on indigenous-owned land from Point Grondine to Bayfield Inlet.

Although owned and operated separately, the park is managed in collaboration with the neighbouring Killarney Provincial Park.
