= Wiikwemkoong First Nation =

Unceded territory in Ontario, Canada

Wiikwemkoong
- Unceded territory
- Wiikwemkong Unceded Reserve
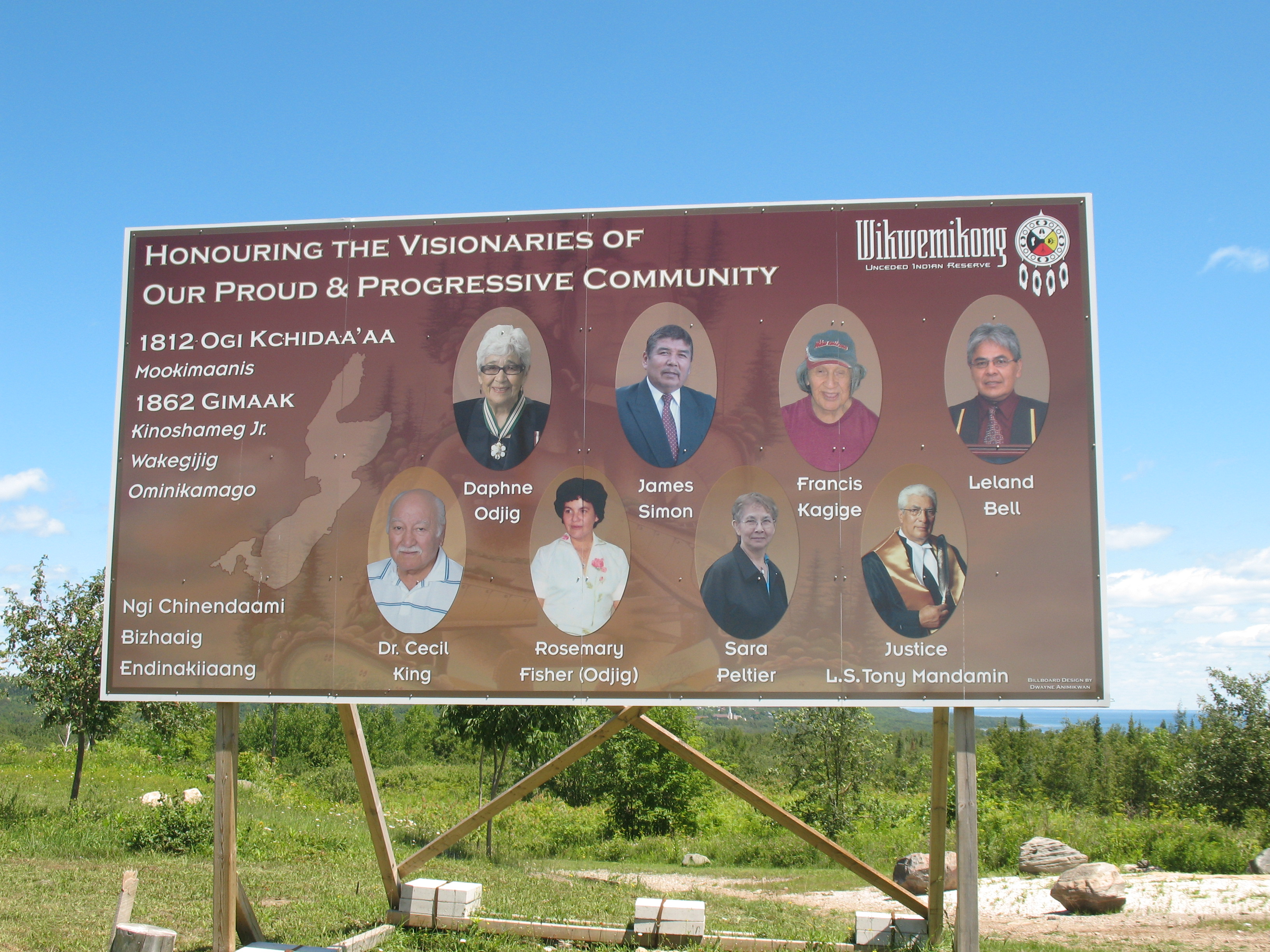
- Welcome sign
- Nickname: Wiiki
- Location within Southern Ontario
- Coordinates: 45°42′N 81°43′W
- Country: Canada
- Province: Ontario
- District: Manitoulin
- First Nation: Wiikwemkoong

Government
  - Type: First Nation
  - Chief: Tim Ominika
  - MP: Jim Belanger (CPC)
  - MPP: Bill Rosenberg (PC)

Area
  - Land: 412.97 km^{2} (159.45 sq mi)

Population (2021)
  - Total: 8,431
  - Density: 6.3/km^{2} (16/sq mi)
- Time zone: UTC-5 (EST)
  - Summer (DST): UTC-4 (EDT)
- Postal code span: P0P 2J0
- Area code: 705
- Website: www.wiikwemkoong.ca

Wiikwemkoong First Nation is a First Nation on Manitoulin Island in Southern Ontario. Wiikwemkoong Unceded Territory (nicknamed Wiky, previously named Wikwemikong), is the name of First Nation reserve in the northeast of Manitoulin Island in Manitoulin District, Ontario, Canada. Wiikwemkong is an unceded Indigenous reserve in Canada, which means that it has not "relinquished title to its land to the government by treaty or otherwise."

The local Ojibwe placename is wiikwemkong (Manitoulin dialect; notice the vowel dropping) with the locative -ong ('at') form of wiikwemik 'bay with a gently sloping bottom'. The spelling Wikwemikong is from dialects spoken elsewhere (or in earlier times) that retain the i. The initial element wiikwe- occurs in other forms as 'bay'; the final element -mik cannot be for amik 'beaver' (its local form is mik), a folk etymology that violates the rules for Algonquian stem formation. It can be identified as a variant of the medial element aamik-, which appears, for example, in Southwestern Ojibwe minaamikaa 'there are breakers, shoals, banks (of sand or rocks)', which has initial min- 'islandlike'. The presence or absence of aa- is found in several medial elements in Ojibwe and other Algonquian languages.

The reserve's former name was "Manitoulin Unceded Indian Reserve". The Wiikwemkong Band changed it on August 20, 1968, to "Wikwemikong Unceded Indian people".

The reserve is occupied by Ojibwa, Odawa, and Potawatomi peoples under the Council of Three Fires.

== Geography ==
Wiikwemkong occupies a large peninsula on the eastern end of Manitoulin Island, which is connected to the rest of the island by an isthmus separating South Bay from Manitowaning Bay. The reserve's primary access is via Wiikwemkong Way, which continues off the reserve as Cardwell Street and connects to Highway 6 at Manitowaning. The reserve has a land area of 412.97 km^{2} (159 sq mi) and is the fifth-largest Indian reserve in Canada by area. It is bordered on its west by Assiginack township, by which the peninsula is connected to the rest of Manitoulin Island. The vast majority of the reserve's border is, however, a water boundary with Northeastern Manitoulin and the Islands, by which it is nearly surrounded except for its border with Assiginack.

The Point Grondine Park, located on the mainland near Killarney, also belongs to the Wiikwemkong band. This area, which has been unpopulated since the Point Grondine band moved to Wiikwemkong proper in the 1940s, remained unoccupied and virtually unused by the band until the park was established in 2015.

== History ==
From 1836 to 1862, a considerable portion of Manitoulin Island was set aside as the "Manitoulin Island Indian Reserve" under the Bond Head Treaty. The most important of the pre-confederation treaties were the Robinson Treaties because all subsequent treaties were modeled after these. In 1850, William B. Robinson, a government negotiator and former fur trader, proposed that First Nations reserves be created on the Crown Land acquired through treaties. These Reserves were intended to be the answer to what the immigrant settlers needed for land settlement. First Nation peoples would be set apart on reserves from the new settlers. The Robinson-Huron and Robinson-Superior treaties were signed in September 1850 for large territories north of the two Great Lakes.

According to written records, Lake Huron and Lake Superior area leaders surrendered nearly 15,000,000 hectares of land and the islands in exchange for the establishment of 24 reserves and a payment of approximately $10,000 to be followed by additional annual payment of $2700.

In 1862, most of the islands were again ceded to the government of Canada under the MacDougall Treaty for new settlement by non-natives, resulting in the creation of new reserves at West Bay, Sheguiandah, Sheshegwaning, Pitawankwat Cockburn Island and Sucker Creek. However, two bands which occupied the land that now comprises Wiikwemkong claimed that the bands that signed the Treaty did not represent them, and thus continued to exist as a remnant of the Manitoulin Island Indian Reserve.

In 1968, an amalgamation took place among three bands: Manitoulin Island Unceded Indian Reserve, Point Grondine and South Bay. This amalgamation created the "Wikwemikong Unceded Indian Reserve". In 2014, the Constitution – Wiikwemkong G'chi Naaknigewin – was ratified, subsequently changing the name to Wiikwemkong Unceded Territory.

The band filed a claim with the Canadian government on the issue of the jurisdiction of the Wikwemikong islands in 1984, but the government denied that the band had any right to these islands in 1997. The two parties restarted negotiations in 2007. As of 2022, the province has stated that it is working with the local council to "resolve an outstanding land claim" and "conclude a fair and final settlement".

== Communities ==
In addition to the primary settlement at Wiikwemkong, smaller settlements on the reserve include Buzwah, Kaboni, Murray Hill, South Bay, Two O'Clock, Wabozominissing and Wikwemikonsing.

The reserve is served by five churches:

- Holy Cross Church
- Buzwah Church (Saint Ignatius)
- Kaboni Catholic Church (St. Anthony Daniel Parish)
- South Bay Catholic Church (Our Lady of Grace)
- The Wikwemikong Fellowship

There are two elementary schools, Wasse Abin Junior School (JK, SK, Grades 1-4) and Wasse Abin Pontiac School (Grades 5-8) and Wasse Abin High School.

Two health clinics provide basic services:

- Nadmadwin Mental Health Clinic
- Wiikwemkoong Health Centre

== Transportation ==
Wiikwemkong Way is the key route in the communities and connects with Ontario Highway 6.

The closest airport is Manitowaning/Manitoulin East Municipal Airport in Manitowaning, Ontario. There is no commercial service from this airport.

Ontario Northland operates a twice daily bus that connects to other places on Manitoulin Island as well as the nearest major city, Sudbury, Ontario.

== Culture ==
The reserve is also home to the Wiikwemkong Cultural Festival (Wiikwemkoong Pow-Wow) which is held annually every Civic Holiday weekend (first weekend in August).

This annual event is touted as the largest and oldest pow-wow in Eastern Canada. Considered to be one of the major pow wows in North America, it is attended by many aboriginal dancers who participate in competition of all age ranges, demonstrating traditional, grass, jingle and fancy dancing.

Wiikwemkoong is also home to a professional theatre company, De-ba-jeh-mu-jig Theatre Group, which stages and produces plays about First Nations life and culture, within the mission's ruins next to Holy Cross Church.

== Notable people ==
- Jeannette Corbiere Lavell, Indigenous women's rights advocate
- Josephine Mandamin, environmental activist
- Leonard S. Mandamin, Federal Court of Canada judge
- Daphne Odjig, Odawa/Potawatomi artist
- Autumn Peltier, water activist
- Sladen Peltier, actor
- Peggy Margaret Pitawanakwat, first woman chief, in 1997
- Joseph Shawana, chef
- Crystal Shawanda, country music singer/songwriter
- Kelly Babstock, PWHL hockey player
- Chris Simon, NHL hockey player
- Shayne Corson, NHL hockey player
- Jack Nesbitt, First Round NHL draft pick 2025,
