= La Cloche Mountains =

Mountain range in Ontario, Canada

- La Cloche Range
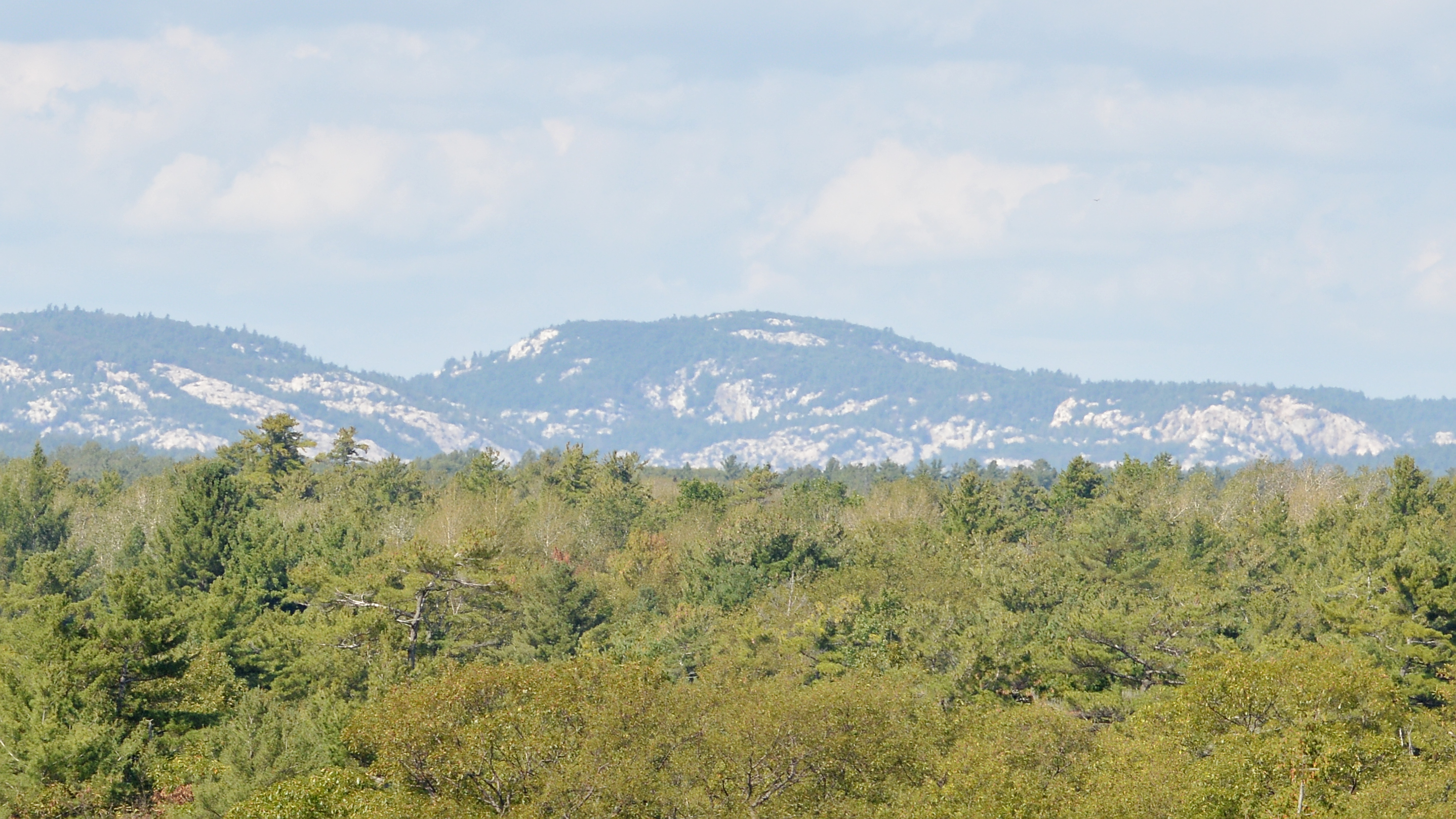

Geography
- Location within Ontario
- Country: Canada
- Province: Ontario
- Range coordinates: 46°7′25″N 81°45′05″W
- Topo map: NTS 41I4 Whitefish Falls

The La Cloche Mountains, also called the La Cloche Range, are a range of mountains in Northern Ontario, Canada, along the northern shore of Lake Huron near Manitoulin Island. The mountains are located in the Canadian Shield, and are composed primarily of white quartzite.

They extend roughly from La Cloche Provincial Park, south of Massey, to Killarney Provincial Park, southwest of Sudbury. The communities of West River, Willisville and Whitefish Falls are located directly within the range; the town of Espanola and the municipality of Killarney are located nearby, however they can be seen (from some vantage points) as far away as Manitoulin Island.

Ontario Highway 6 is the principal transportation route through the range.

Killarney Provincial Park is located in the range and is very popular among tourists. Another feature includes the "Heaven's Gate Trail" which traverses the length of the range from Willisville in the east to Massey in the west. Thought to be an old aboriginal trade route, it traverses the plateau of the range with the North Channel of Lake Huron visible to the south. The trail is particularly gruelling and is rarely traversed mostly due to its length and remoteness from major cities.

== Geology ==
With an estimated age of 1.88 billion years, the La Cloche Mountains consist of metamorphosed quartz sandstone, which accumulated and then deposited in the Georgian Bay region of Ontario 2.5 billion years ago. The mountains themselves were formed during the Penokean Orogeny, a mountain-building stage in the Canadian Shield's geological history. During this time, the sandstone that had accumulated was compressed and heated to form the white quartzite which dominates the landscape today. The hills comprising the La Cloche Mountains are believed to have once been higher than today's Rocky Mountains, and were eroded down to their current altitude of 539 meters at its peak. They remain among the highest altitudes in Ontario.

A southern extension of the La Cloche Mountains, the South La Cloche Mountains, extends to the south and juts into Georgian Bay along Badgeley Point, north of Killarney and Secondary Highway 637.

== History ==
According to legend, the hills were warning bells, or tocsins, used by local First Nations for signalling. These "Bell Rocks" could be heard for a considerable distance when struck, and accordingly when voyageurs explored the area they named it with the French word for "bell" — La Cloche.

== Camps ==
- Charlton Lake Camp

== Gallery ==
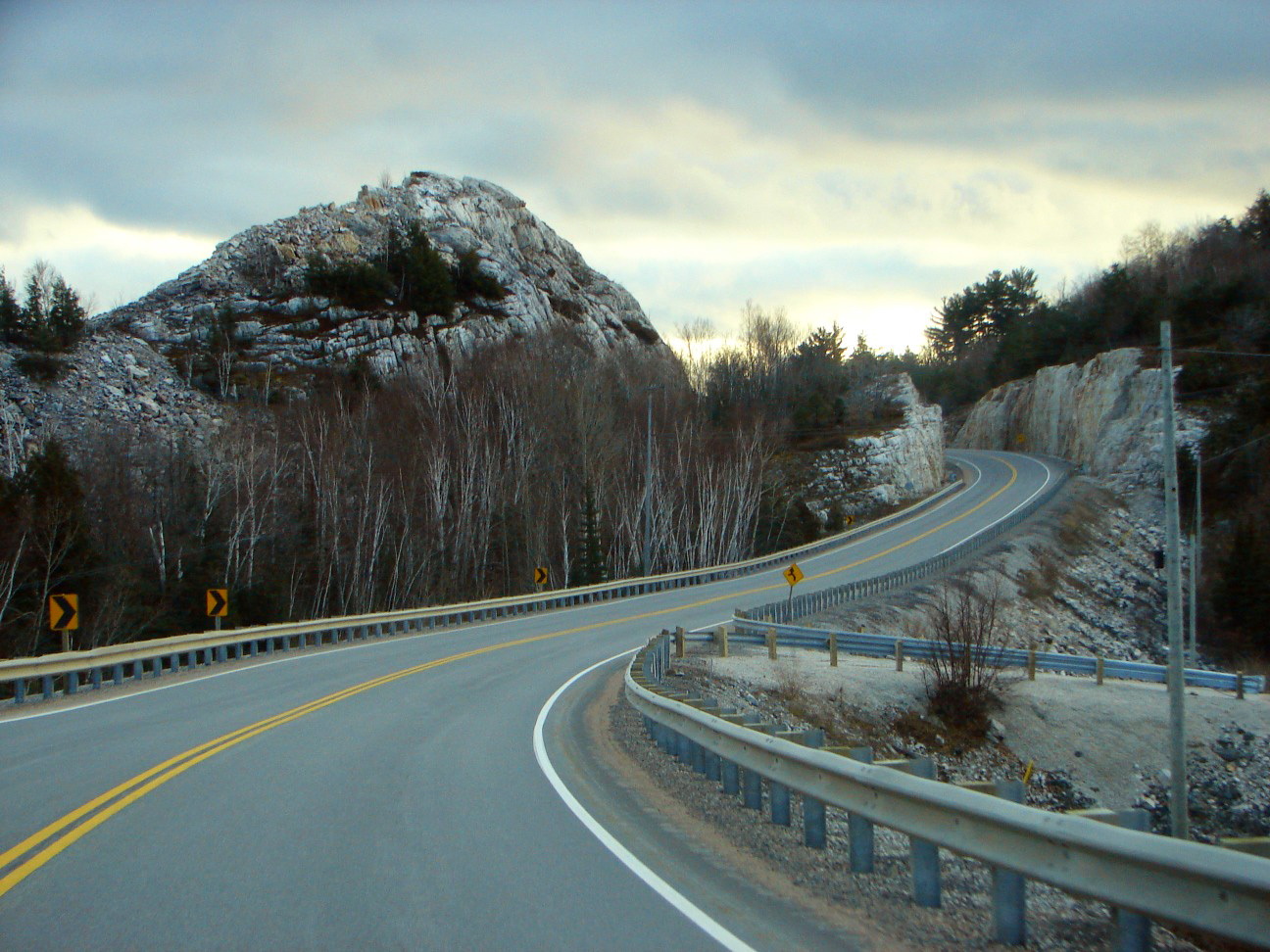
Highway 6 through the La Cloche Mountains near Whitefish Falls.

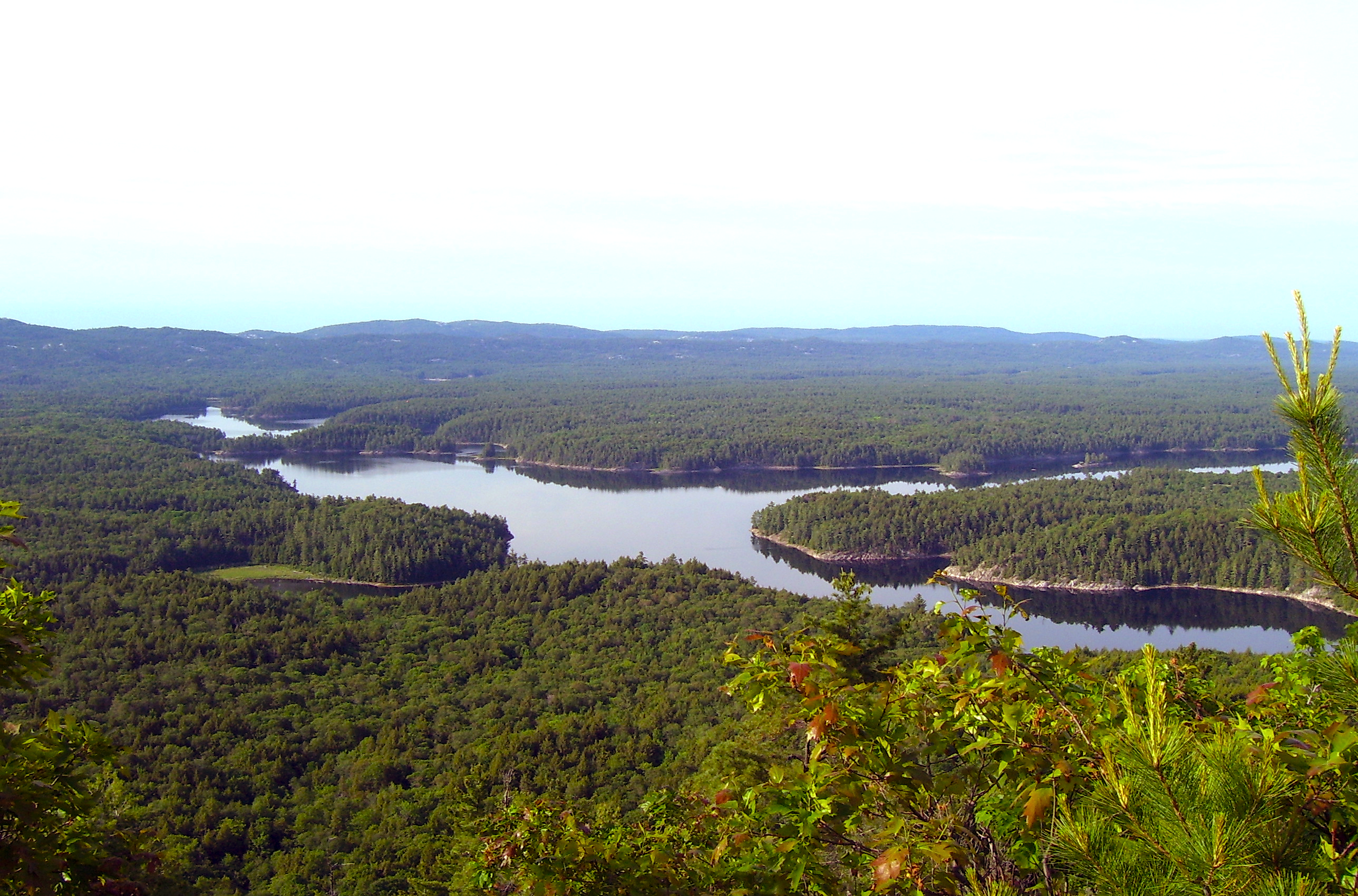
View from the La Cloche Silhouette Trail in Killarney Provincial Park.

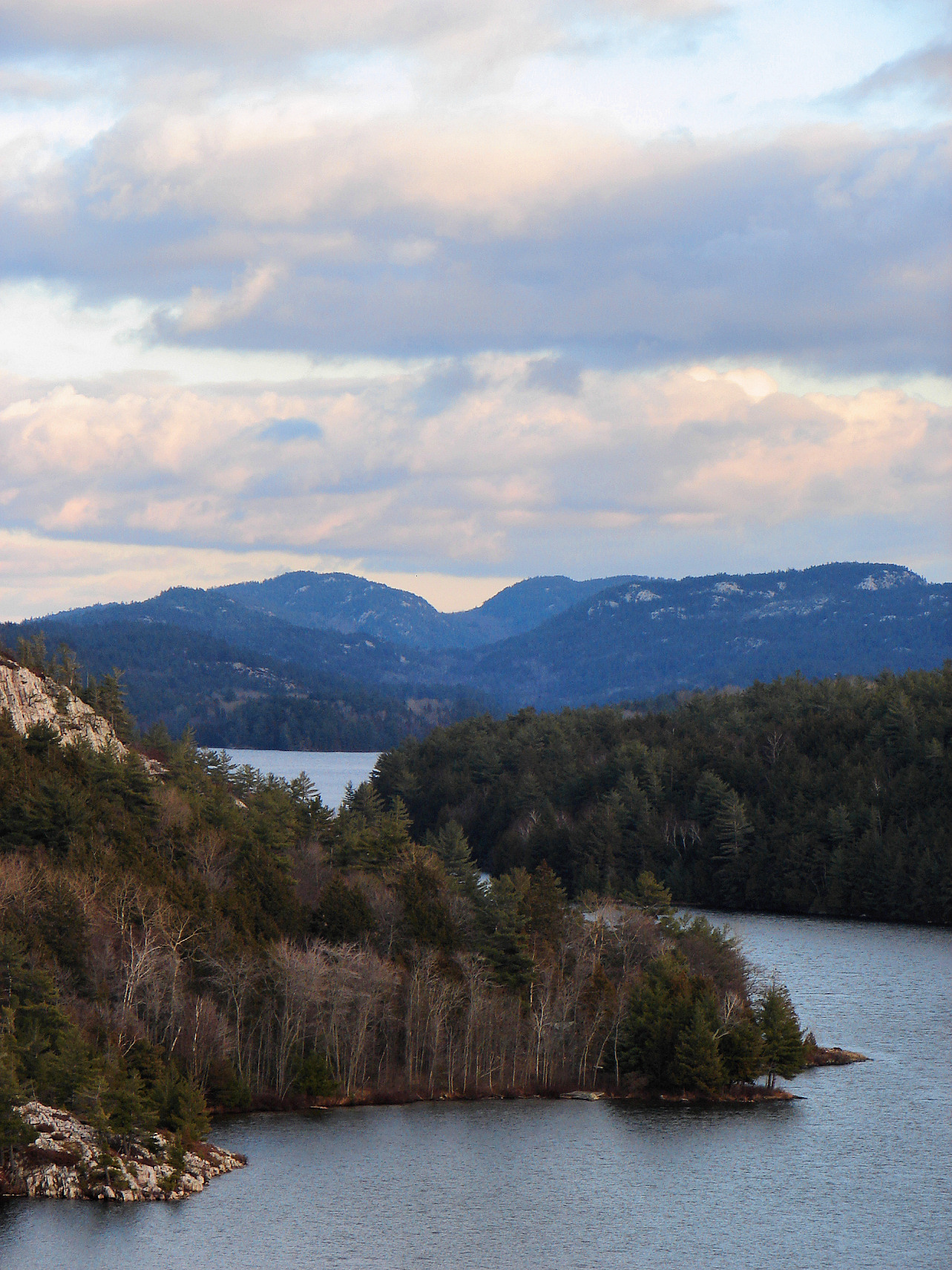
Alternative view of the range.

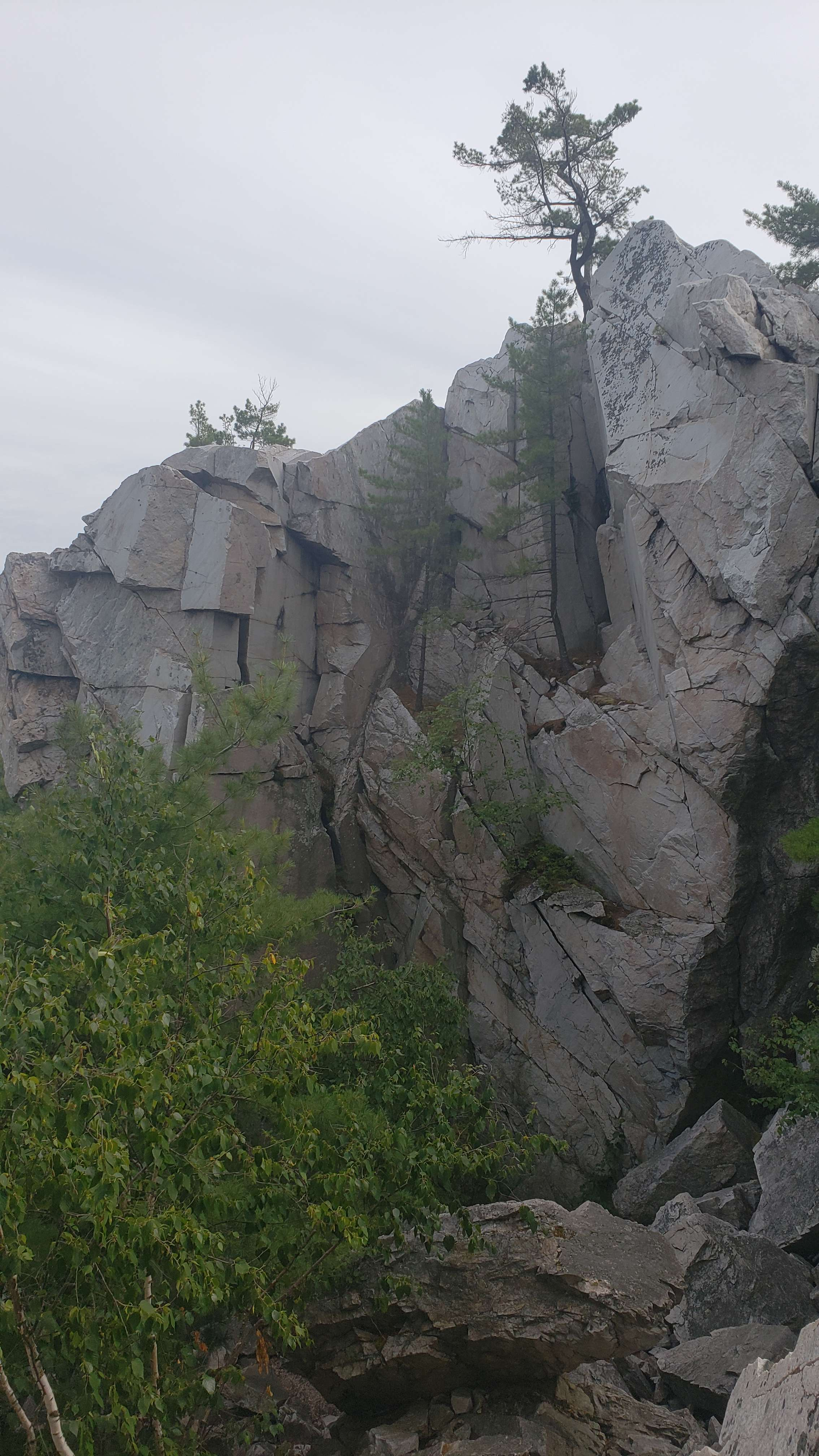
The Crack Trail is named after this interesting formation and the surrounding rocks.
