= The Crack (trail) =

Hiking trail in Ontario, Canada

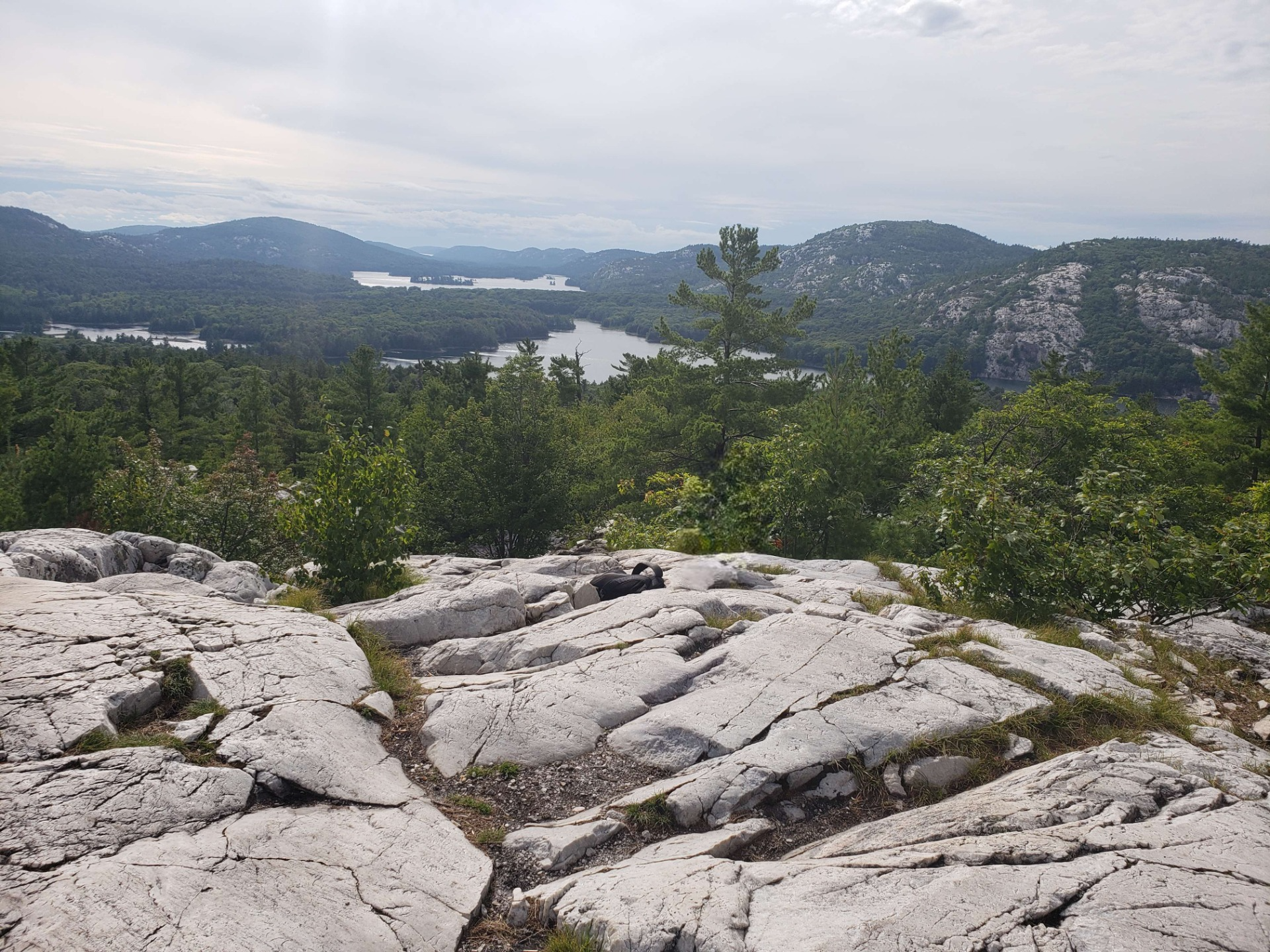
- View from the summit of The Crack
- Length: 7.5 km (4.7 mi)
- Location: Killarney Provincial Park, Ontario
- Trailheads: The Crack (Parking Lot)
- Use: Hiking
- Highest point: 355 m (1,165 ft)
- Difficulty: Moderately challenging
- Season: Year-round
- Sights: Panoramic view of the surrounding mountains and lakes, quartzite cliff filled with boulders
- Hazards: Severe weather Black Bear; Mosquitos; Biting flies Steep grades Diarrhea from water

Trail map
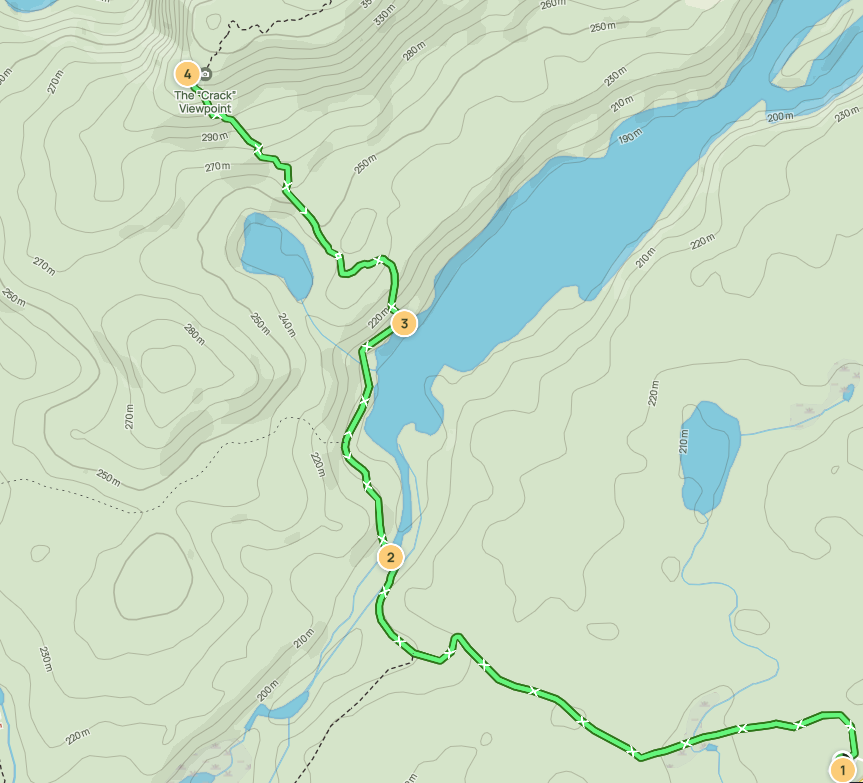
- Elevation map showing The Crack

The Crack trail is a 7.5-kilometre out-and-back trail located in Killarney Provincial Park in Ontario, Canada. It is known for the quartzite cliff which creates a formation resembling a crack in the mountain filled with boulders, and the panoramic views of the mountains and lakes at the peak.

== Description ==
The trail starts off at relatively flat ground, connected with the La Cloche Silhouette Trail (46.0441°N 81.3243°W). As the La Cloche Silhouette Trail diverges after only 1.5 kilometres, hikers are given an opportunity to proceed with the hike or take the La Cloche Silhouette Trail as usual. Continuing along, after 0.3 more kilometres, hikers will be able to see their first glimpse of the mountains from the Kakakise Wood Bridge which goes across the Kakakise Lake. Hikers will continue on the lakeshore which has many areas usable for swimming for the next 0.8 kilometres.

At this point, they will begin the ascension of the mountain. At the start, they will be going through steep, heavily forested hills, and they will begin to notice patches of rocks. After 0.6 kilometres of going up, the forest will have finished as the ground will have become quartzite by this point, so the hiker would have a view of surrounding mountains. After 0.4 kilometres, they will encounter The Crack, a valley in the mountain filled with boulders created by boulders fallen from a slicing cliff, resembling a crack in the mountains, which the trail is named after. The hiker is required to climb the boulders through this valley to continue.

After climbing through the quartzite boulder covered area for 0.2 kilometres, the hiker will reach the summit (46.0614°N 81.3482°W), where they will be greeted by a panoramic view of Killarney Lake, OSA Lake, the Georgian Bay, and the surrounding mountains.

== Etymology ==
The Crack is named after the a valley in the mountain filled with rocks created by a cliff, which resembles a crack in mountain due to the rough, slicing nature of the valley.

== Gallery ==
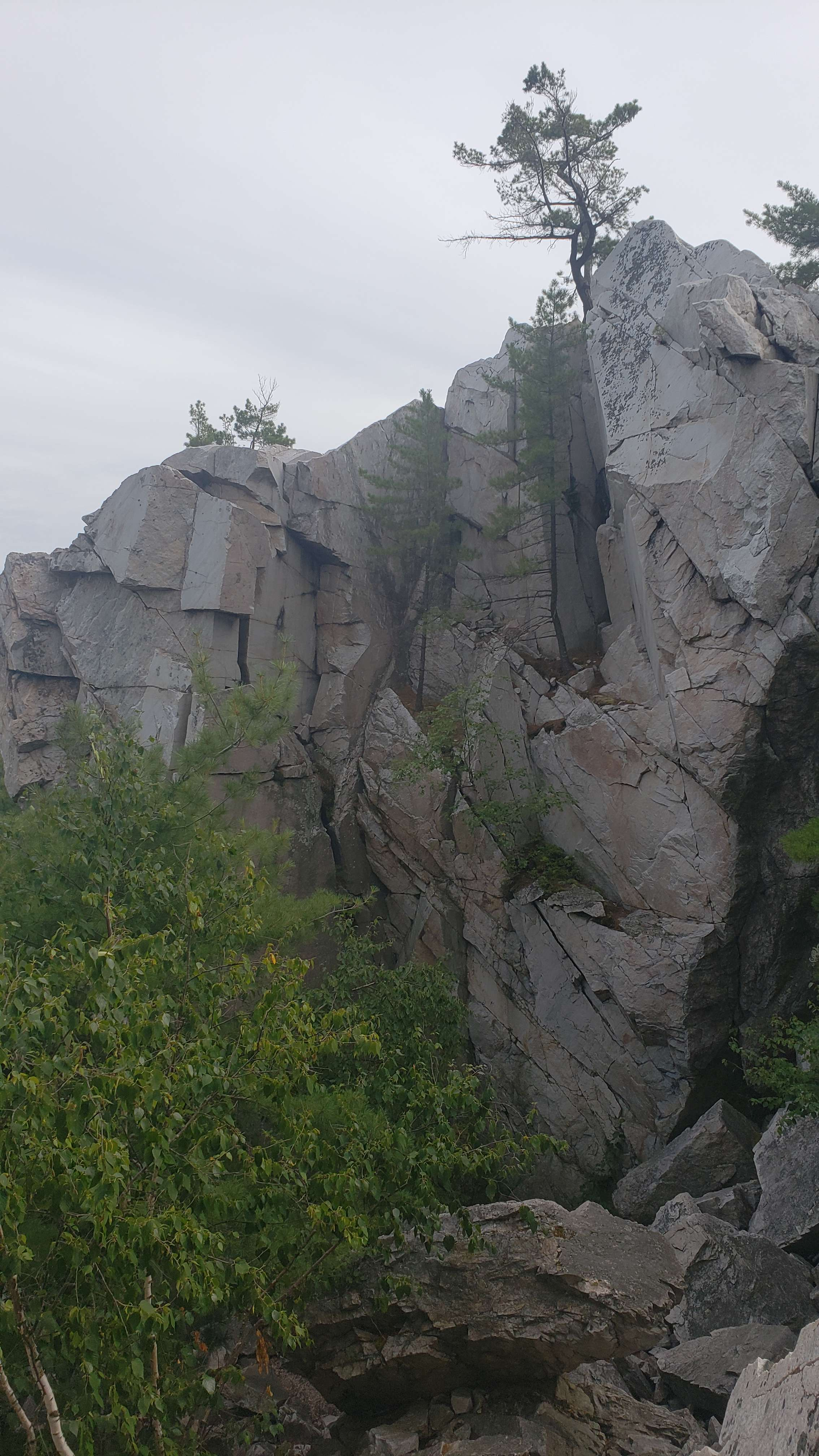
This quartzite cliff creates what appears to be a crack in the mountain filled with boulders
