= Killarney Provincial Park Observatory =

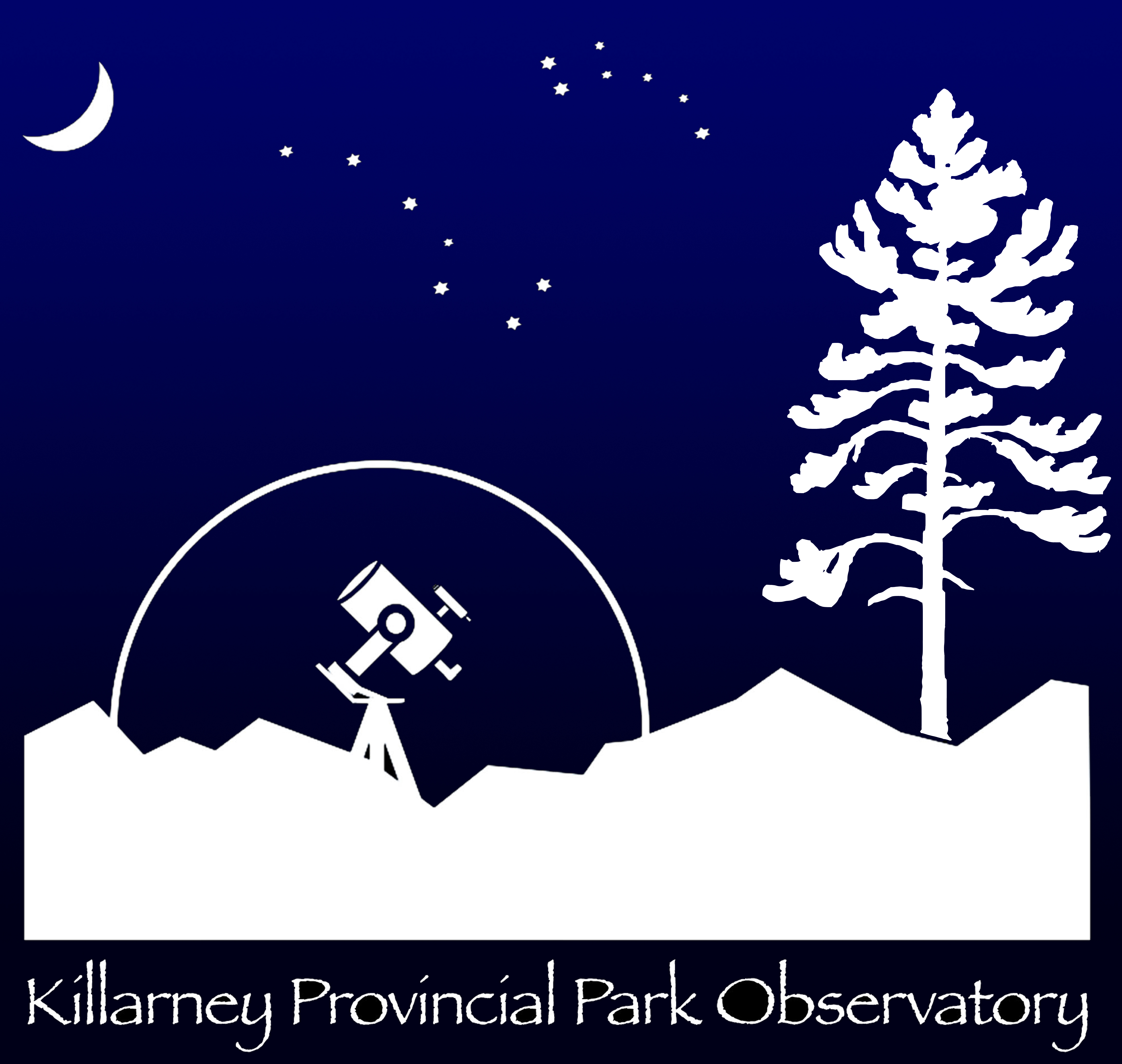
- Organization: Killarney Provincial Park
- Location: Killarney, Ontario
- Coordinates: 46°00′45″N 81°23′58″W
- Altitude: 266 m (873 ft)
- Telescopes: telescope
- Related media on Commons

The Killarney Provincial Park Observatory is an astronomical observatory located at the George Lake Campground of Killarney Provincial Park (a 420 km drive north of Toronto or a 100 km drive southwest of Sudbury). The Observatory is operated by Ontario Parks and houses two observatory buildings. The original facility contains a 10" telescope with solar filter. While it is ideal for nighttime observing, it is primarily utilized for daytime viewing of the Sun. The newer facility (built in 2018) contains a 16" fully automated telescope with a 5" refractor and is ideal for research, astrophotography and public use. The telescopes are available for Discovery programs (formally known as Natural Heritage Education (NHE) programs) as well as private sign-out (self-use) by interested visitors.

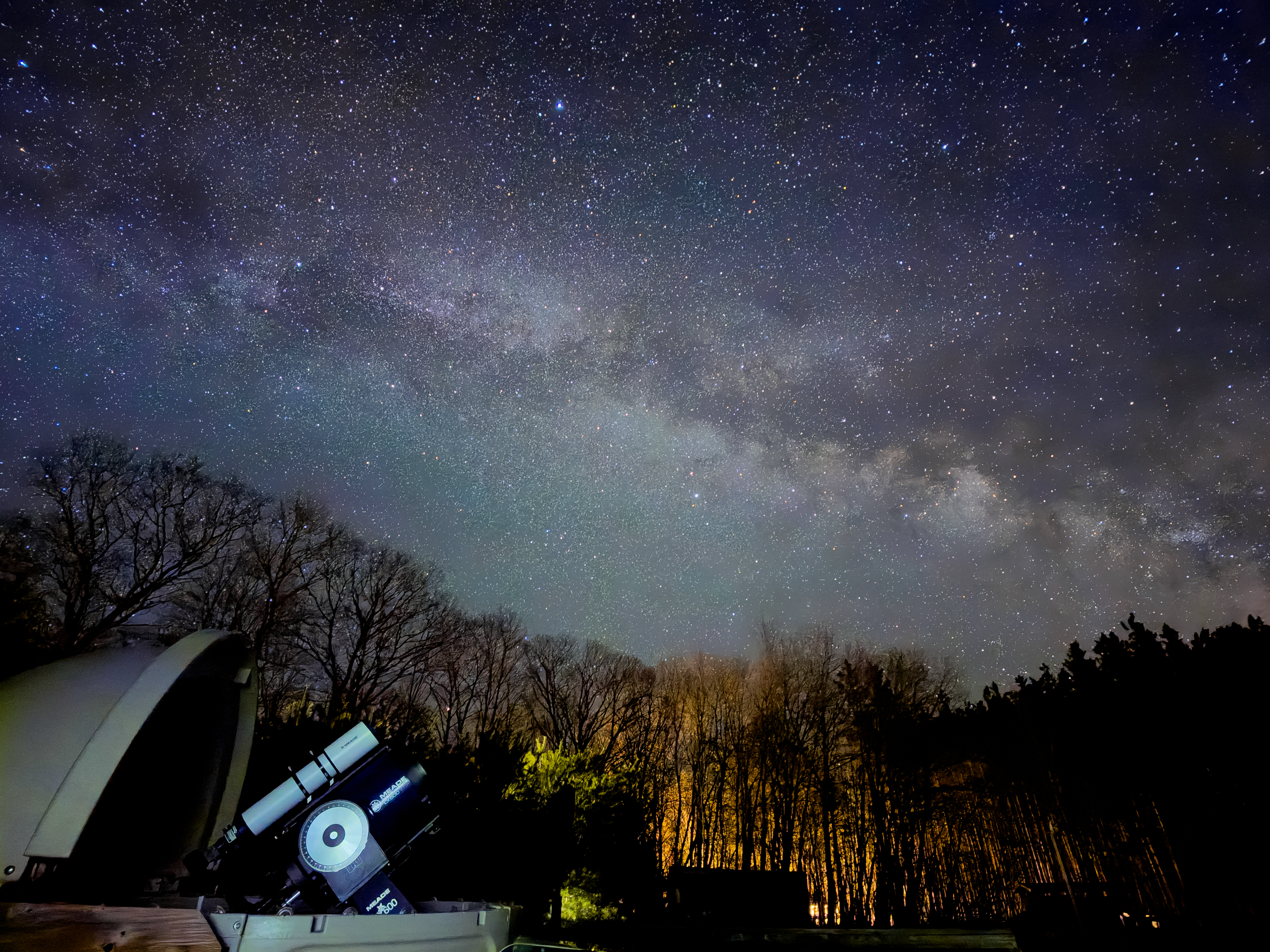
Milky Way over the Kchi Waasa Debaabing Observatory at Killarney Provincial Park

== Astronomy in Killarney Provincial Park ==
Astronomy education began in the Park in 1985 as part of outreach programs provided by Bruce Waters on behalf of the McLaughlin Planetarium. Interest in the astronomy programs quickly grew with these Discovery Programs (formally Natural Heritage Education (NHE) programs) seeing some of the highest attendance levels (exceeding 200 people per night). In time, other astronomy educators such as Bill Gardner, Bill and Vicki Sherwood and staff from Science North, began providing programs of their own.

Astronomy education continues to this day and has included Western as well as Indigenous (Anishinaabek) constellation learning, comet making workshops and music as a way to bring the mysteries of the stars to the visitors of Killarney Provincial Park.

== History of the Observatory Complex ==
=== Waasa Debaabing (smaller observatory housing a 10" Telescope) ===
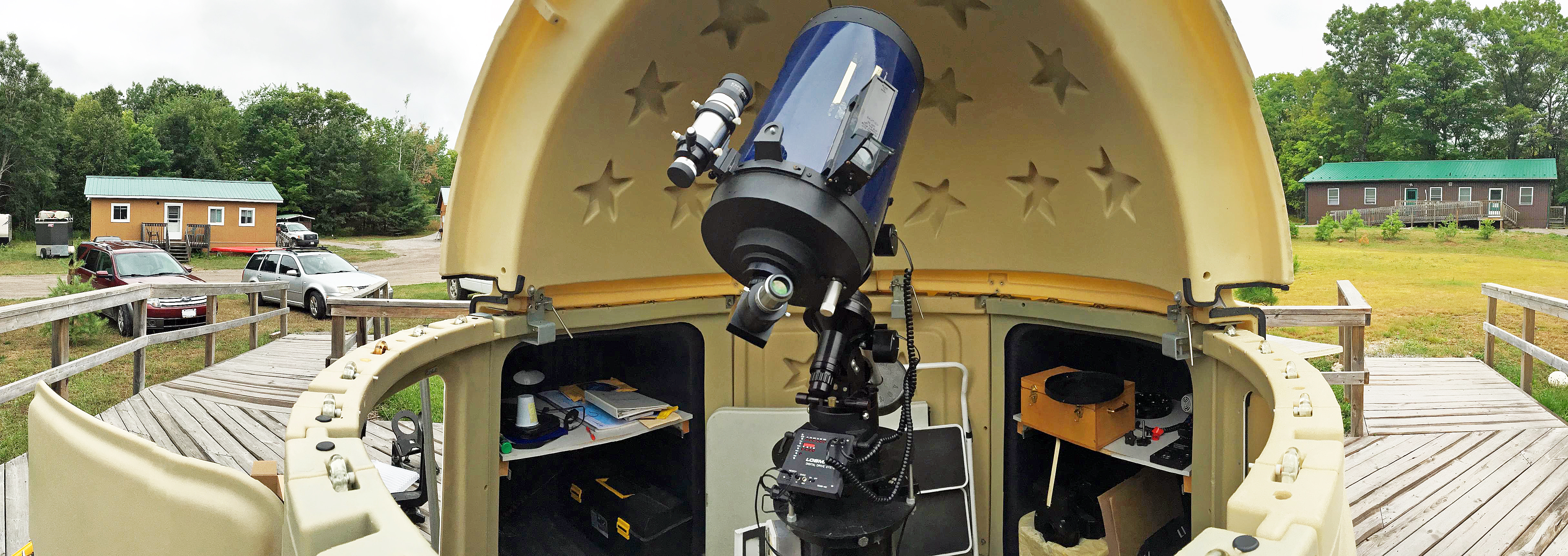
The 10" telescope and observatory

In 2010, to celebrate 25 consecutive years of astronomy education provided by Bruce Waters, it was decided to establish a permanent facility (observatory building and telescope system) that could meet the following requirements. To be available for:

1. year-round use
2. the Discovery staff to provide programing of their own (rather than solely relying upon astronomy educators)
3. self-use such that any person with interest could sign out the facility for themselves

A 10" Meade 2120 LX3 on a fork mount within a SkyShed POD system was opened to the public on July 17, 2010. At the time, the observatory was the first public use observatory in any provincial park. This setup provided excellent views but limited automation. In 2011, the telescope mount was upgraded to a Losmandy G11 Gemini 2 automated system, donated by Bill and the Gardner family. This upgrade significantly improved the usability of the telescope for staff and Park visitors alike. The observatory sits upon a deck with two ramps (to ease the movement of people) donated by the Friends of Killarney Park.

==== Anishinaabemowin Naming ====
On September 28, 2019, at the Stars over Killarney event, the Observatory was given its official name - Waasa Debaabing (WAH-suh De-BAH-bing) which, in Anishinaabemowin means,"seeing far (as the eye can see)" or "the far in the distance seeing". The name was given in honour of the Indigenous astronomy theme of the 2019 Stars over Killarney event.

To hear the name in Anishinaabemowin, please click here.

=== Kchi Waasa Debaabing (larger observatory housing 16" and 5" Telescopes) ===
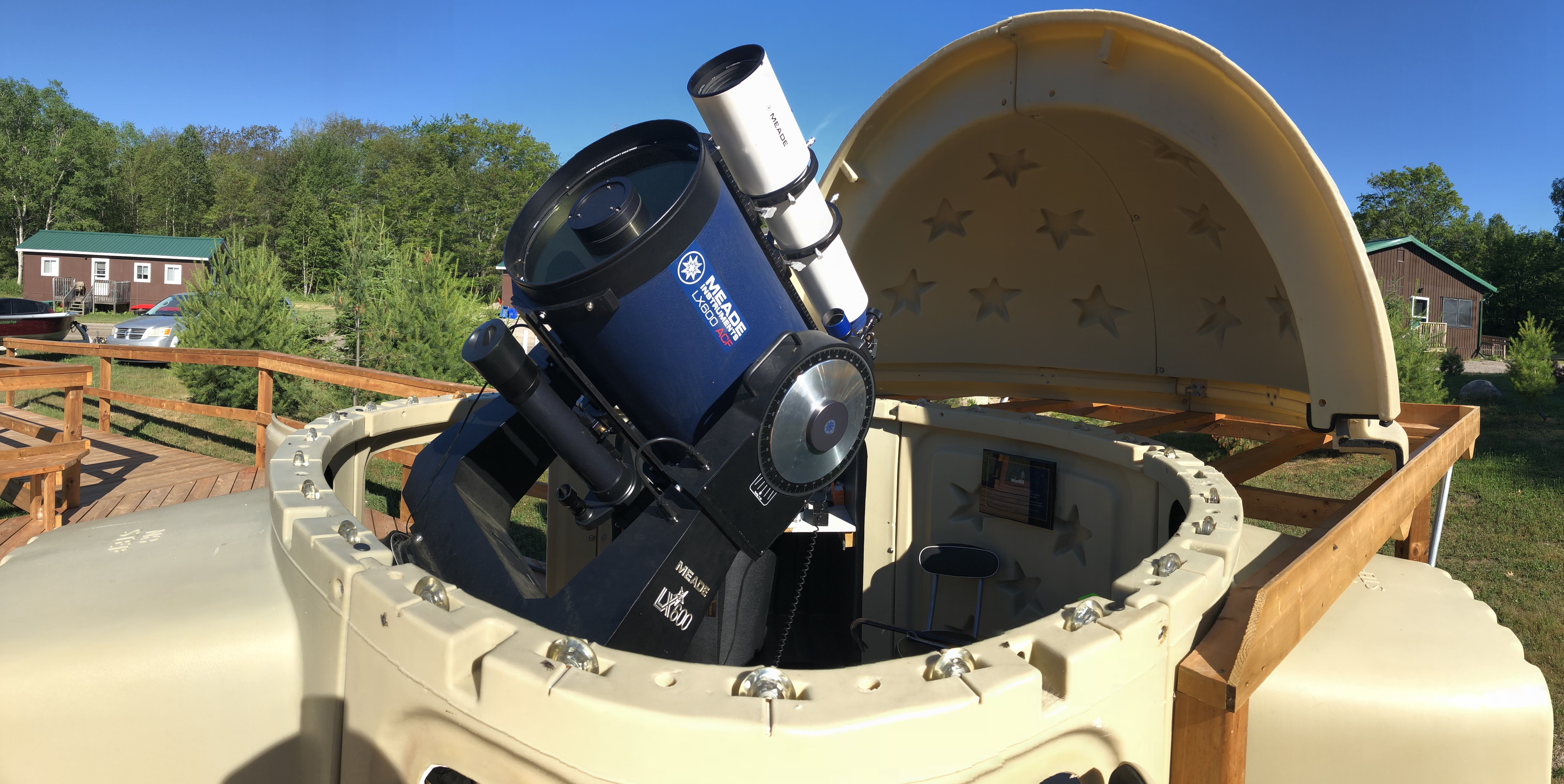
KPPO Dome 2 with Dome Off-2

After eight years of use, it became apparent that there were ways to optimize the facility and, in 2017, an upgrade initiative kicked off to provide a second observatory dome and equipment that would meet six key requirements:

1. spectacular visual capability
2. optimized for both wide-field and high magnification astrophotography
3. high usability for both the Discovery program staff as well as self use
4. increase of available space within the observatory to suit public programming
5. low maintenance for Park staff (protection from moisture, bugs, pollen, etc.)
6. highly resistant to accidental damage

A decision matrix was established and vetted against real world feedback from existing users who were kind enough to donate their time and expertise, most notably:

- Hyde Memorial Observatory (Lee Thomas and Rick Johnson),
- Z-Field Observatory (Kevin Cobble),
- Lethbridge Astronomy Society (Dwight Jones, Telescope Coordinator), and
- Paul Titus, Amateur Astronomer and former President of Roper Mountain Astronomers of Greenville, SC

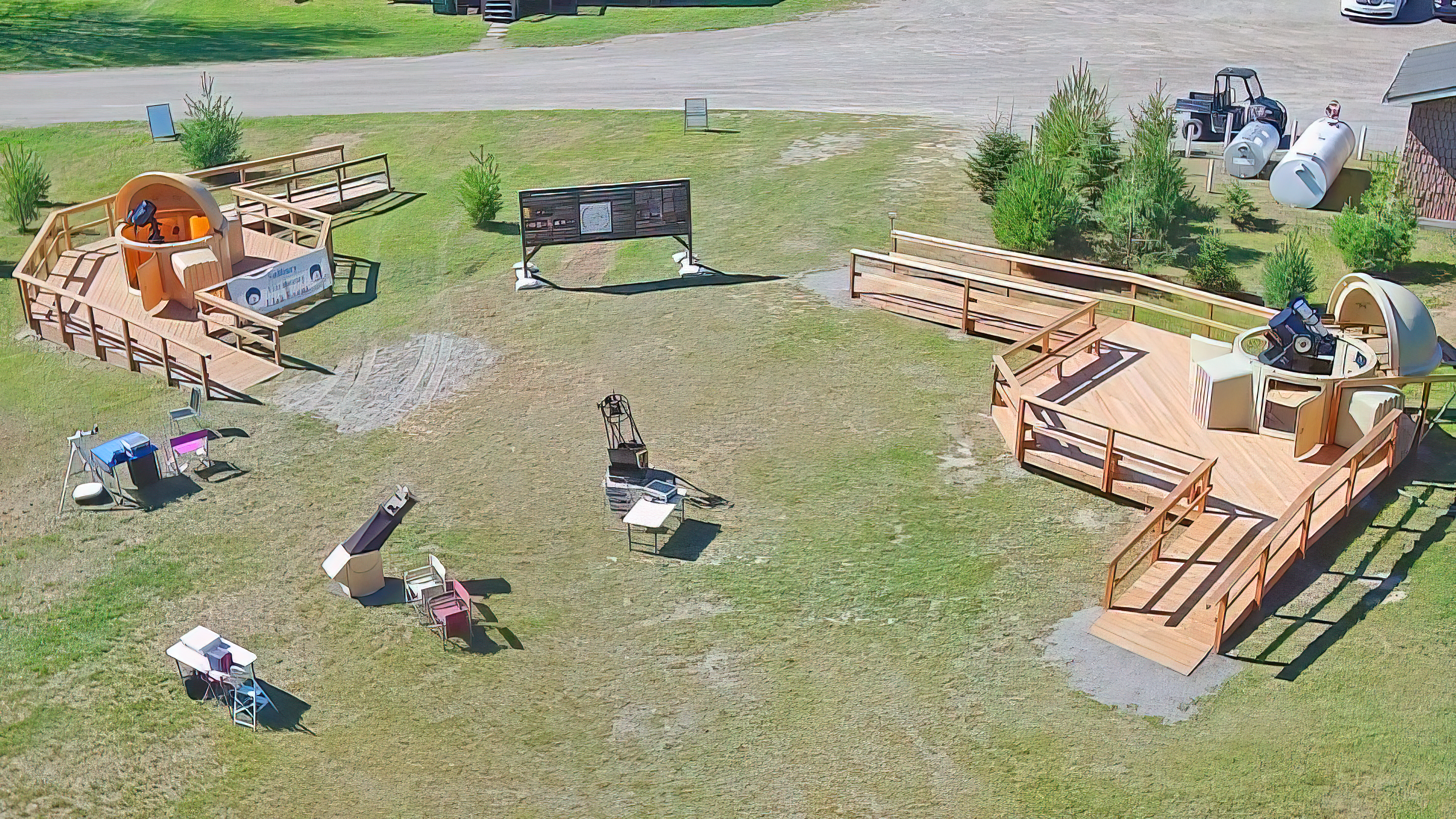
Aerial view of the Killarney Provincial Park Observatory Complex at the Stars over Killarney event (2018). Photo: Colin Durocher

Based on the requirements and usage data available, it was decided that a closed tube telescope of large aperture plus an apochromatic refractor mounted on a permanent equatorial pier would suit all the requirements listed above.

In 2018, the new Observatory was opened and houses a Meade LX600-ACF 16" f/8 (ideal for planets and deep sky astrophotography) with a Meade Series 6000 130mm ED APO refractor mounted on top for lower magnification / wide field use. The entire assembly sits on a cast steel Permanent Equatorial Pier to ensure overall stability and consistency of the equipment. This dome utilizes a SkyShed GPOD with a two-door observatory structure and features a "slide-off" roof assembly to provide more headroom. The observatory sits upon a deck with two ramps (to ease the movement of people) donated by the Friends of Killarney Park.

In 2023, Plate solving and autoguiding technology were added to provide extremely accurate positioning capability to the system as well as the ability to track objects with extreme accuracy for several hours at a time.

==== First Light of the 16" Telescope ====
The second Observatory (housing the 16" and 5" telescopes) was completed in June 2018. First light for the new system was on the weekend of June 9, 2018 with spectacular "space-walk" views of the Globular Star Clusters M13, M11, M22, M3, M80, as well as the Nebulae M8 and M20. Attendees celebrating the opening included astronomers in residence, park Interpreters from the Discovery team and representation from Science North's Space Place.

===== Anishinaabemowin Naming =====
On September 28, 2019, at the Stars over Killarney event, the Observatory was given its official name - Kchi Waasa Debaabing (g-CHEH WAH-suh De-BAH-bing) which, in Anishinaabemowin means,"seeing very far (as far as the eye can see)" or "the very far in the distance seeing". The name was given in honour of the Indigenous astronomy theme of the 2019 Stars over Killarney event.

To hear the name in Anishinaabemowin, please click here

== Astronomy Programs ==
=== Dark-sky preserve ===
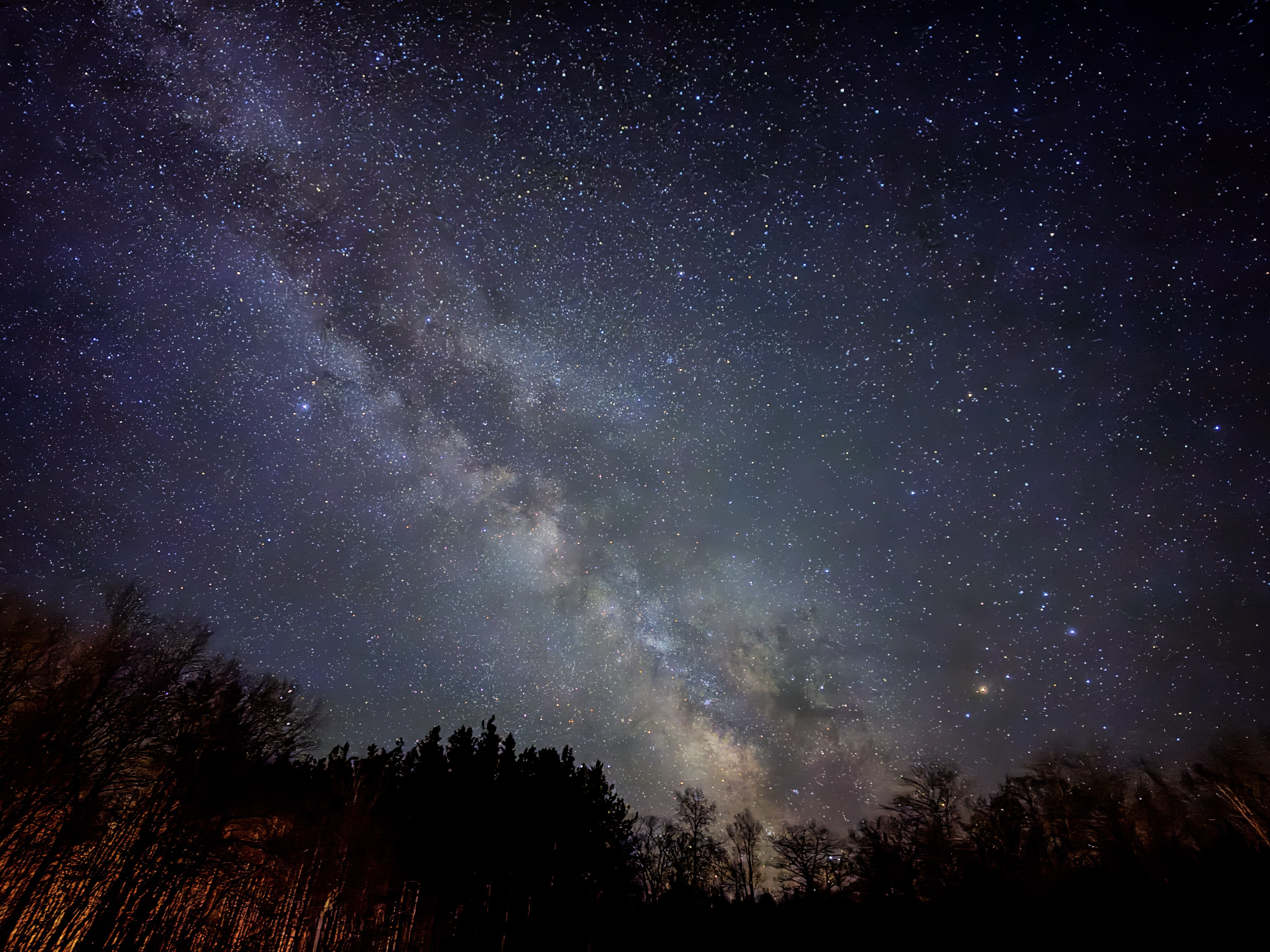
An unprocessed single iPhone image of the Milky Way, facing south, from Killarney Provincial Park

Killarney Provincial Park has been designated as a Wilderness Class Provincial Park within Ontario. As such, its development plan includes significant provisions to protect all of the pristine wilderness that it governs. In keeping with this special designation, significant attention has been spent to ensure that lighting controls fall within the best practices of the Royal Astronomical Society of Canada. On February 28, 2018, Killarney Provincial Park joined the list of prestigious locations designated as a Dark-Sky Preserve by the Royal Astronomical Society of Canada. In keeping with the requirements of the Dark-Sky Preserve designation, the Park provides education on proper lighting use and controls as part of its regular programming.

=== Aurora Borealis (Northern Lights) ===
The Observatory complex is located at forty-six degrees north. While not as far north as many ideal aurora viewing locations (Yellowknife for instance), the views can be quite spectacular. For example, during the solar storm of October 10, 2024, this marvellous image displaying green and red aurora over the observatory was captured. Note the sides of the Kchi Waasa Debaabing Observatory are lit up in Green from the Aurora.

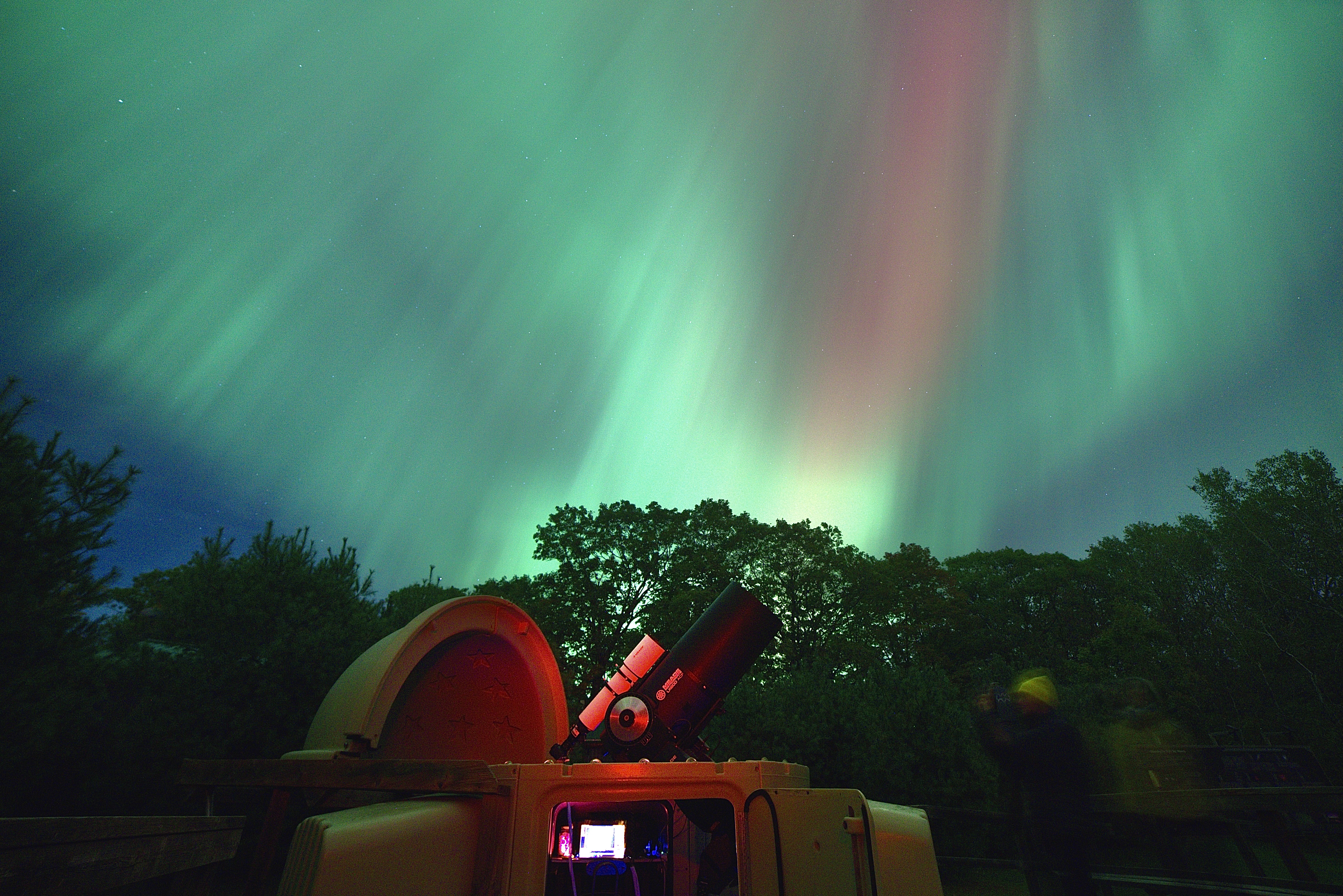
The Aurora Borealis above the Killarney Provincial Park Observatory, during the October 10, 2024 event.

=== Self Use Sign-out ===
While the Kchi Waasa Debaabing Observatory is used for special large audience presentations (with upwards of 200 people) and by the Discovery Team interpreters, the Waasa Debaabing Observatory has been optimized for self-use. This program, currently available from July through September, allows anyone visiting the park free access to a research level observatory that only requires the most basic of training (provided in advance by the Park staff). In this regard, the Killarney Provincial Park Observatory was North America's first free, public, self-use facility in North America.

=== Astronomer in Residence program ===
Established in 2012, the Killarney Provincial Park "Astronomer in Residence" program sees experienced guest astronomers providing their services to the park on a daily basis. These resident astronomers provide a variety of educational services in support of the NHE programs. Such services include: daily observatory training, solar observing, night sky observing and other programs that encompass a wide variety of information that is related to both astronomy and its relationship to the Killarney Provincial Park experience.

In 2022, Killarney Provincial Park partnered with York University's Allan I. Carswell Observatory, the largest on-campus observatory in Canada, to further enhance and enrich the program. The new program will include all of the existing astronomer in residence activities plus will take advantage of the capabilities of both observatories to display astronomical objects and events. This will include live steams and multimedia presentations to not just the Killarney Provincial Park public but to a much wider audience.

=== Stars over Killarney ===
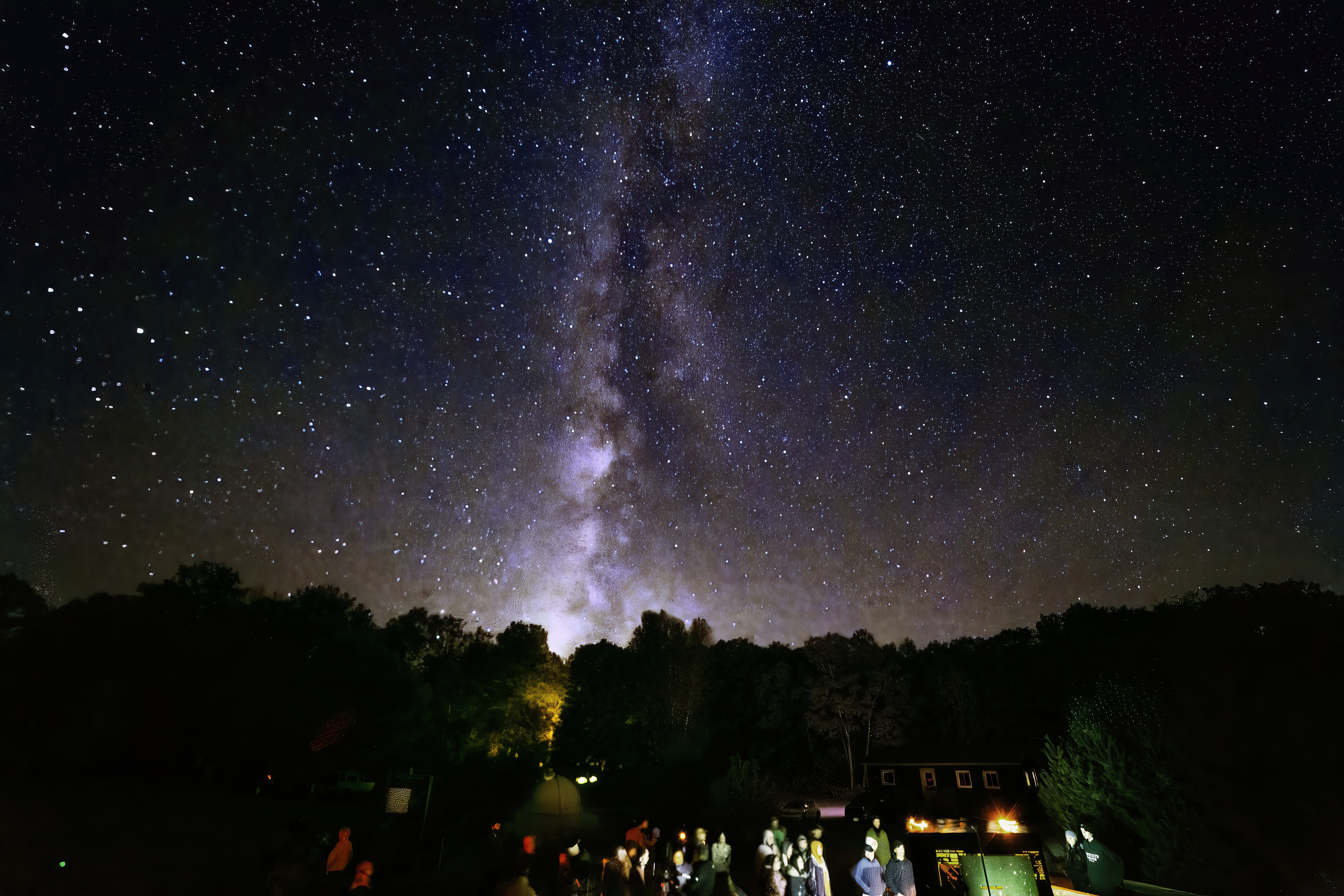
Stars over Killarney Provincial Park Observatory

Established in 2018 to commemorate the 125th year of Ontario Parks and the 150th year of the Royal Astronomical Society of Canada and the establishment of Ontario Parks' first Dark Sky Preserve, a new Discovery program - Stars over Killarney - was created to connect the beauty of Killarney Provincial Park with an element of astronomical knowledge. The inaugural collaborative event with Science North and Killarney Provincial Park featured day programs such as comet making workshops, geology discovery walks, presentations on the Solar System and planetarium shows followed by a special night program on the importance of Dark Sky Preserves. Finally, the audience was treated to views of the stars where they learned the Western and Indigenous constellations as well as obtained views through the Park's telescopes and those set up by the Sudbury Centre of the Royal Astronomical Society of Canada.

==== Stars over Killarney Programs ====
- SOK 2018: Importance of Preserving Dark Skies
- SOK 2019: Indigenous Astronomy
- SOK 2022: Understanding the Geology of the Earth, Moon and Beyond

=== Meteorite Display ===
In addition to the programs available in the Park, visitors can enjoy looking at a small meteorite collection available inside the Park office during regular visiting hours. Included are an iron meteorite fragment, an etched slice of meteorite displaying Widmanstätten patterns and a very rare Allende (pronounced Ah-Yen-Day) meteorite that contains pre-solar grains.

== Astrophotography ==
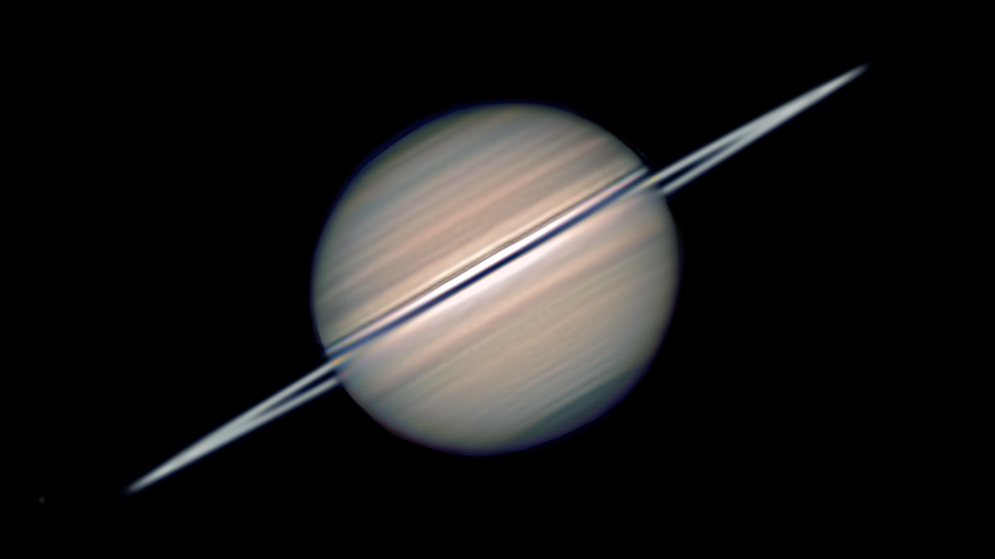
Saturn as imaged through the 16" (.4 metre) telescope within the Kchi Waasa Debaabing Dome at the Killarney Provincial Park Obervatory

The light gathering ability and resolution quality of a 16" telescope coupled with Meade's "Advanced Coma-Free" design in a Dark-Sky Preserve provides exceptional astrophotographic capability. As can be seen from the images below, the observatory has provided excellent imaging capabilities

The following images were taken through various instruments found in the Kchi Waasa Debaabing Dome (hosting the 16" (0.4 metre) and 5" (.13 metre) telescopes) and the Waasa Debasbing Dome (hosting the 10" (0.25 metre) telescope).

=== Galaxies ===
M31, the Andromeda Galaxy, Killarney Provincial Park Observatory	M51, the Whirlpool Galaxy as imaged in HaOiiiRGB from the 0.4 Metre telescope within the K'chi Waasa Debaabing Dome at the Killarney Provincial Park Observatory complex	NGC 4565, the Needle Galaxy as imaged from the 0.4 Metre telescope within the K'chi Waasa Debaabing Dome at the Killarney Provincial Park Observatory complex	NGCs 4038 and 4039, the Antennae Galaxies, as imaged in HaOiiiRGB from the 0.4 Metre telescope within the K'chi Waasa Debaabing Dome at the Killarney Provincial Park Observatory complex

=== Clusters ===
M13, the Hercules globular cluster through the 0.4 Metre telescope in the Kchi Waasa Debaabing Dome at the Killarney Provincial Park Observatory Complex	M45, the Pleiades Cluster as taken through the 0.13 Metre telescope within the Kchi Waasa Debaabing Dome at the Killarney Provincial Park Observatory Complex	M11, the Wild Duck Cluster as taken through the 10" (0.25 Metre) telescope in the Waasa Debaabing Dome at the Killarney Provincial Park Observatory Complex	M35, NGC 2158 and IC 2157 as taken through the 0.13 Metre telescope in the Kchi Waasa DeBaabing Dome at the Killarney Provincial Park Observatory

=== Nebulae ===
The Veil Nebula (NGC 6960, NGC 6992 and NGC 6995) as imaged with a 61mm telescope in the Kchi Waasa Debaabing Dome at the Killarney Provincial Park Observatory Complex	M20, the Trifid Nebula as taken by the 10" (0.25 Metre) telescope in the Waasa Debaabing Dome at the Killarney Provincial Park Observatory Complex	M8, the Lagoon Nebula and open cluster NGC 6530, imaged with the 130mm telescope in the Kchi Waasa Debaabing Dome at the Killarney Provincial Park Observatory Complex	M57, the Ring Nebula imaged through the 0.4 Metre telescope in the Kchi Waasa Debaabing Dome at the Killarney Provincial Park Observatory Complex
A single 10 second image of M27, the Dumbbell Nebula, imaged through the 0.4 Metre telescope in the Kchi Waasa Debaabing Dome at the Killarney Provincial Park Observatory Complex	The Rho Ophiuchi Nebula Complex taken from a 61mm refractor from the Killarney Provincial Park Observatory. Total integration time is 21 minutes	M42 as imaged with both the 0.13 Metre and 0.40 Metre telescopes in the Kchi Waasa DeBaabing Dome at the Killarney Provincial Park Observatory	

=== Double Stars ===
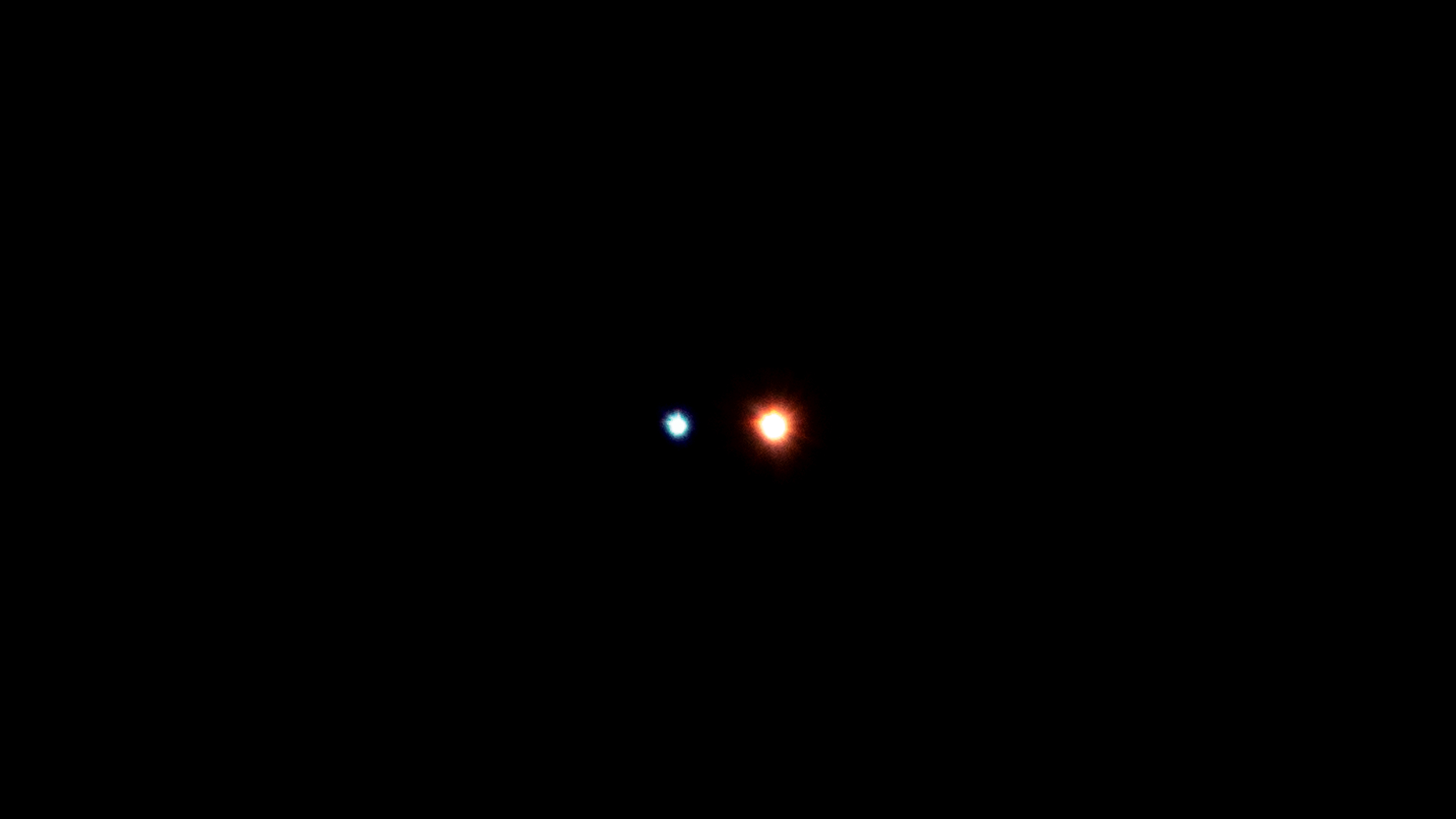
Albireo Killarney Provincial Park Observatory

=== Solar System ===
Half-Moon, through the 0.4 Metre telescope in the Kchi Waasa Debaabing Dome at the Killarney Provincial Park Observatory Complex	Mars imaged with the 0.4 metre telescope in the Kchi Waasa Debaabing Dome at the Killarney Provincial Park Observatory during the 2020 opposition	Jupiter with Europa taken at 6:05 UT on November 13, 2024, by the with 16" (40cm) telescope in the Kchi Waasa DeBaabing Dome in Killarney Provincial Park	Saturn imaged through the 16” telescope within the Kchi Waasa Debaabing Dome of the Killarney Provincial Park Observatory Complex

== The 16" Telescope Observatory and SkyShed POD Setup ==
=== Observatory modifications ===
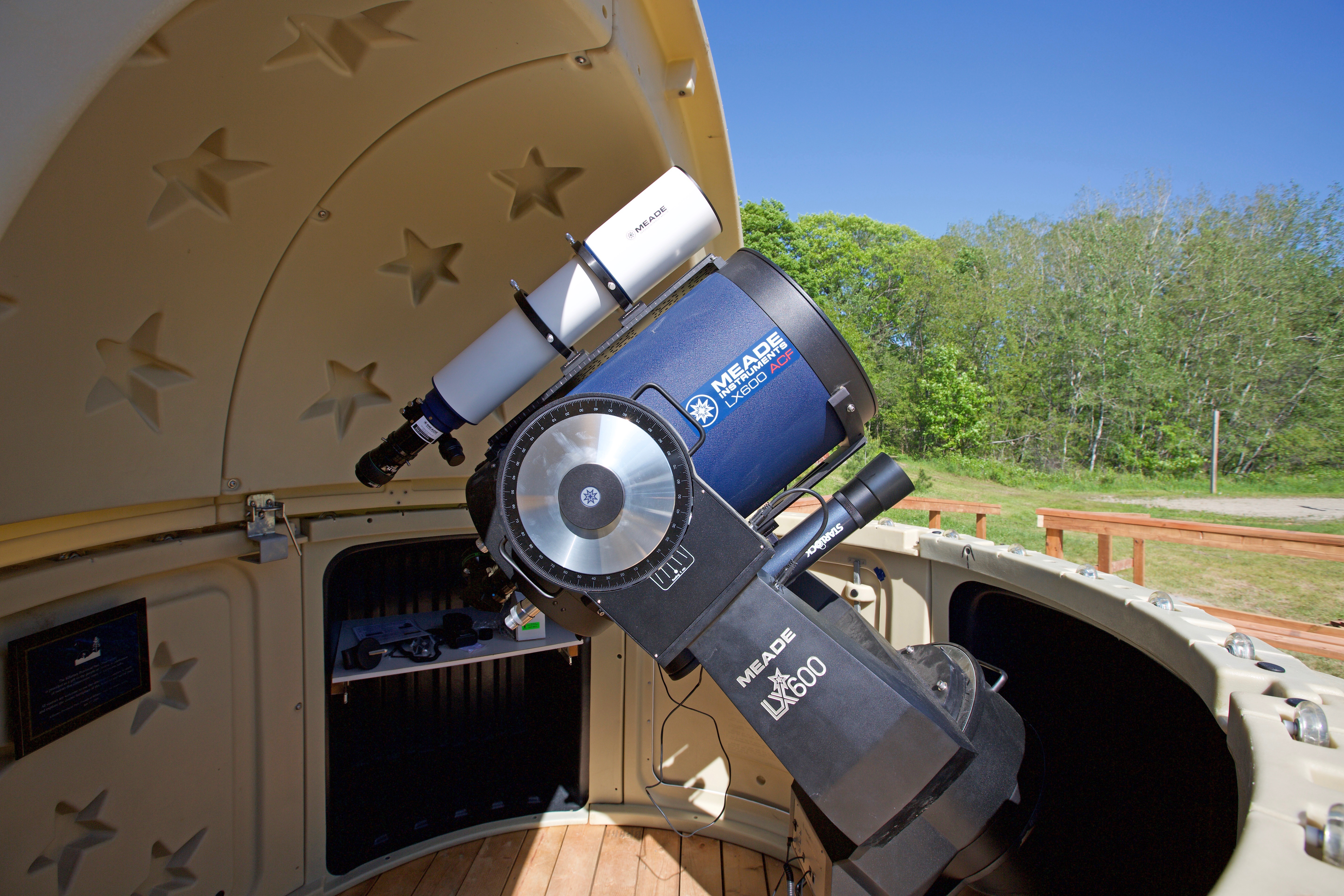
KPPO 2018 - From West 0 degrees

The Skyshed POD system is normally designed to house a Telescope of maximum 14" in size. However, with the careful placement of the permanent equatorial pier inside the southernmost storage POD bay, the 16" plus refractor were all shifted southwards allowing the height necessary to accommodate the entire system.

In addition, by using a Fork Mount and not a German equatorial mount with its heavy and extended counterweight, more space was provided within the observatory structure itself.

=== Concrete and cast steel pier alignment ===
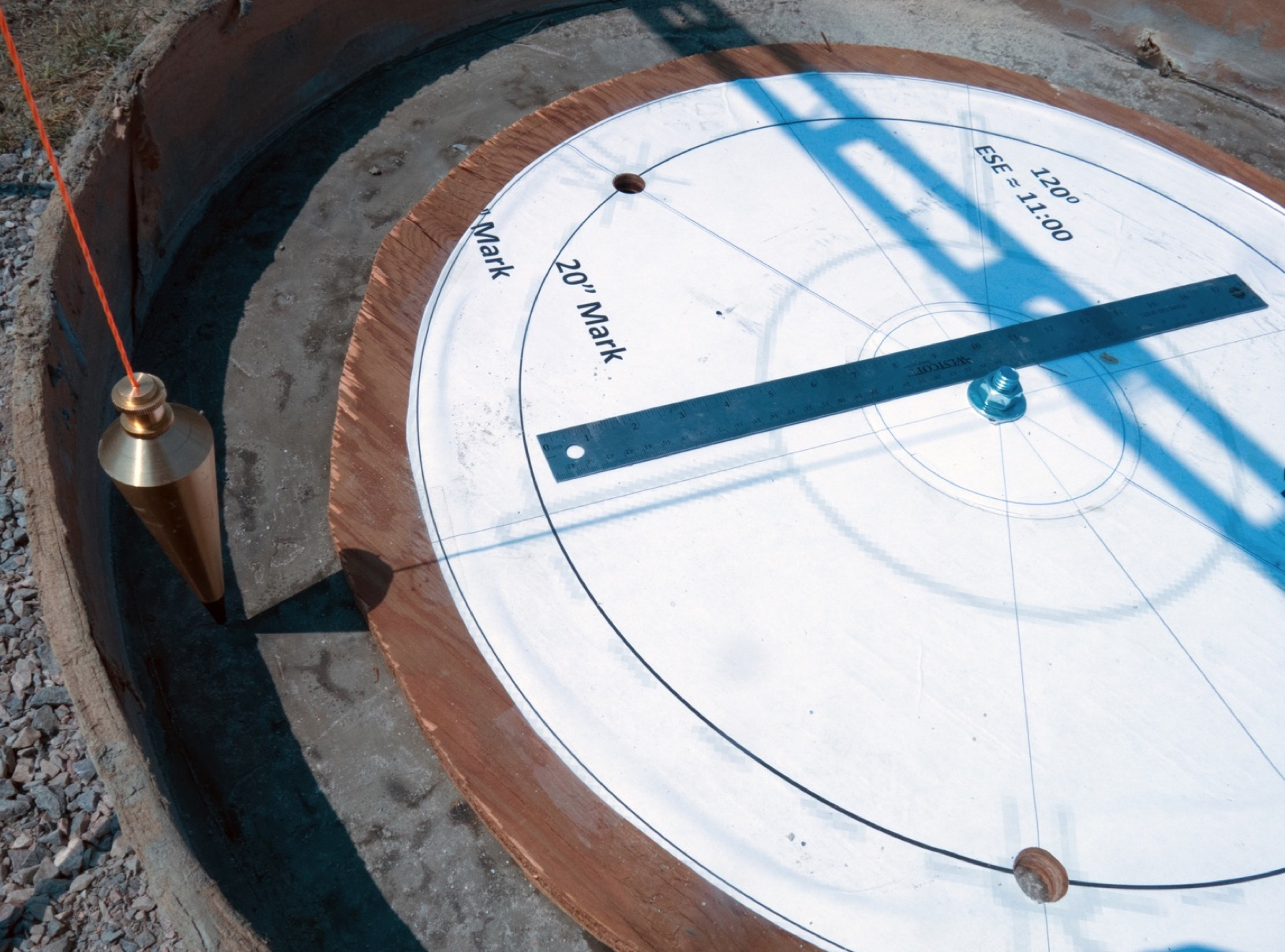
Using a plumb bob to find true North

To support the weight of the telescope system (over 500 lbs) and to ensure that the system was set up for long term maintenance-free use, it was decided to set everything atop a rigid, fixed equatorial mount. The Meade Permanent Equatorial pier was chosen and custom cast to the latitude of Killarney Provincial Park. In addition, its height was reduced by 12" so that it could better fit within the observatory dome and eliminate the necessity of using a step ladder.

==== Construction and alignment of the concrete mount alignment ====
Because the location is subject to significant frost heaving, 6000 pounds of concrete were poured to a depth of 6' deep to form a foundation and 36" diameter solid concrete pier. Once the concrete had set, it was time to worry about preparation for the alignment of the cast steel pier. Meade provides the cast steel pier mount with approximately 5 degrees of play so a very accurate alignment onto the concrete base would be required to ensure that the necessary tolerances would accommodate the play provided. Using a compass is tricky and often inaccurate due to the rebar within the concrete pier interfering with the compass' magnetic reading. So another solution was required.

Thousands of years ago, many cultures used the plumb bob to find proper alignment and it was decided to use this technique to obtain perfect alignment. Two readings were taken separated by two hours to obtain a very accurate triangulated result. Exact positions of the sun for the Observatory location were taken from a smartphone using an astronomy application. A one lb wooden jig (substituting for the 250 lb steel mount) was pivoted so that the shadow from the plumb bob fell exactly along one of the pre-drawn lines. Once the alignment process was completed with the jig, guide holes were drilled into the concrete base before the actual steel pier was fitted atop. Once it was confirmed that the guide holes were properly aligned to the steel pier, three 12" threaded rods were epoxied into fully drilled holes and allowed to set over night.

== Selected books ==
In 2011, a unique guide book was published in which all of the proceeds are to be directed towards supporting the Observatory as well as other Friends of Killarney Park activities. A Camper's Guide to the Universe, has useful stories, anecdotes and much information derived from Bruce Waters' astronomy talks in the park. This book is geared towards campers and lay folk who are interested in an introductory field guide to the skies.

== See also ==
- List of astronomical observatories
- List of astronomical societies
- Lists of telescopes
