= Silver Peak (Ontario) =

Mountain in Ontario, Canada

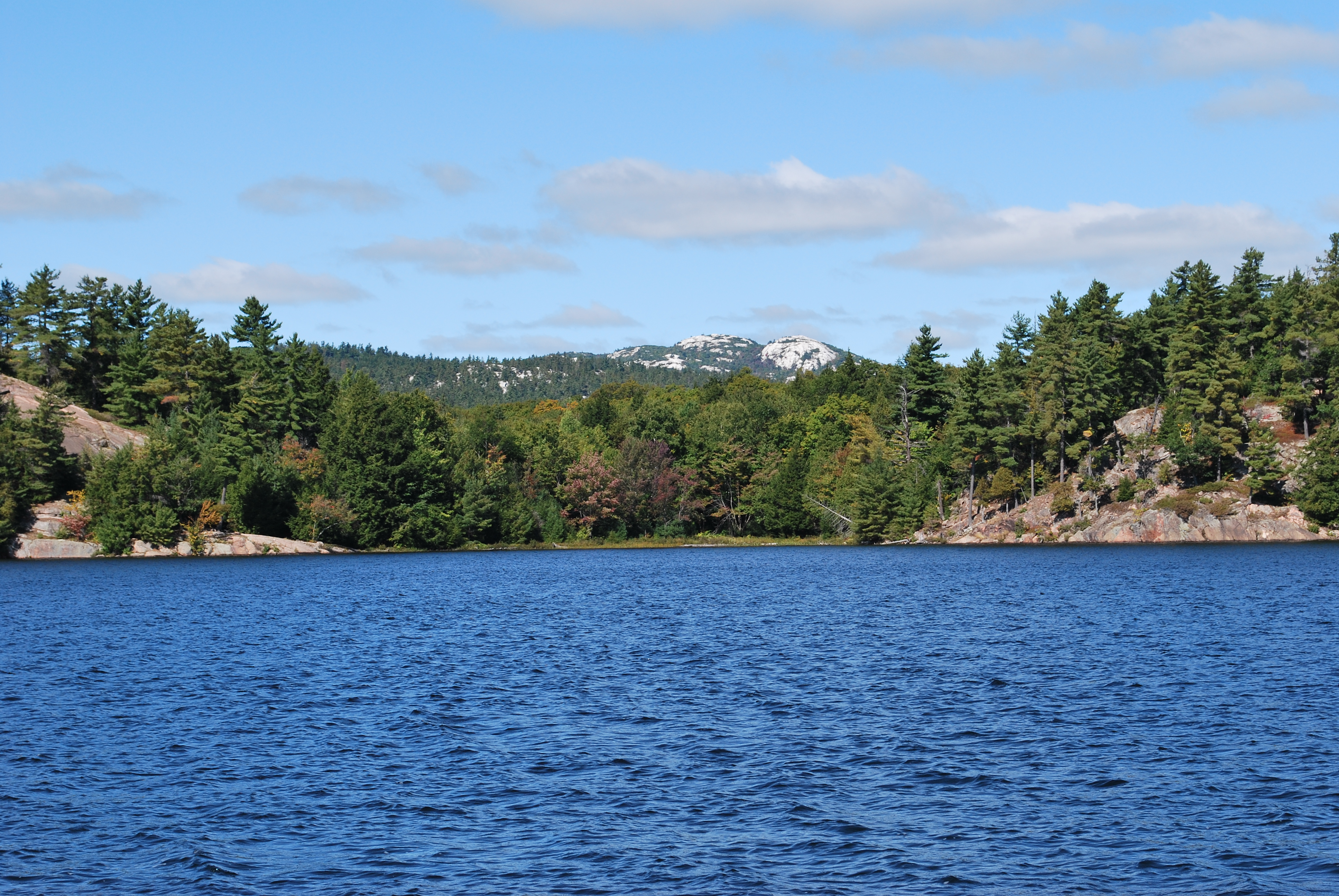

Highest point
- Elevation: 1,768 ft (539 m) NAVD 88
- Prominence: 1000 ft (305 m)
- Coordinates: 46.11010°N 81.28220°W

Geography
- Location: Killarney, Ontario, Canada
- Parent range: La Cloche Mountains

Silver Peak is the highest point in Killarney Provincial Park, located in the southern La Cloche Mountains of Ontario, Canada.

The mountain and nearby hilltops are composed of eroded quartzite with stretches of granite to the south. The peak is a remnant of an ancient mountain range that once covered the area.

== See also ==
- La Cloche Mountains
- Killarney Provincial Park
