= La Cloche Silhouette Trail =

Hiking trail in Ontario, Canada

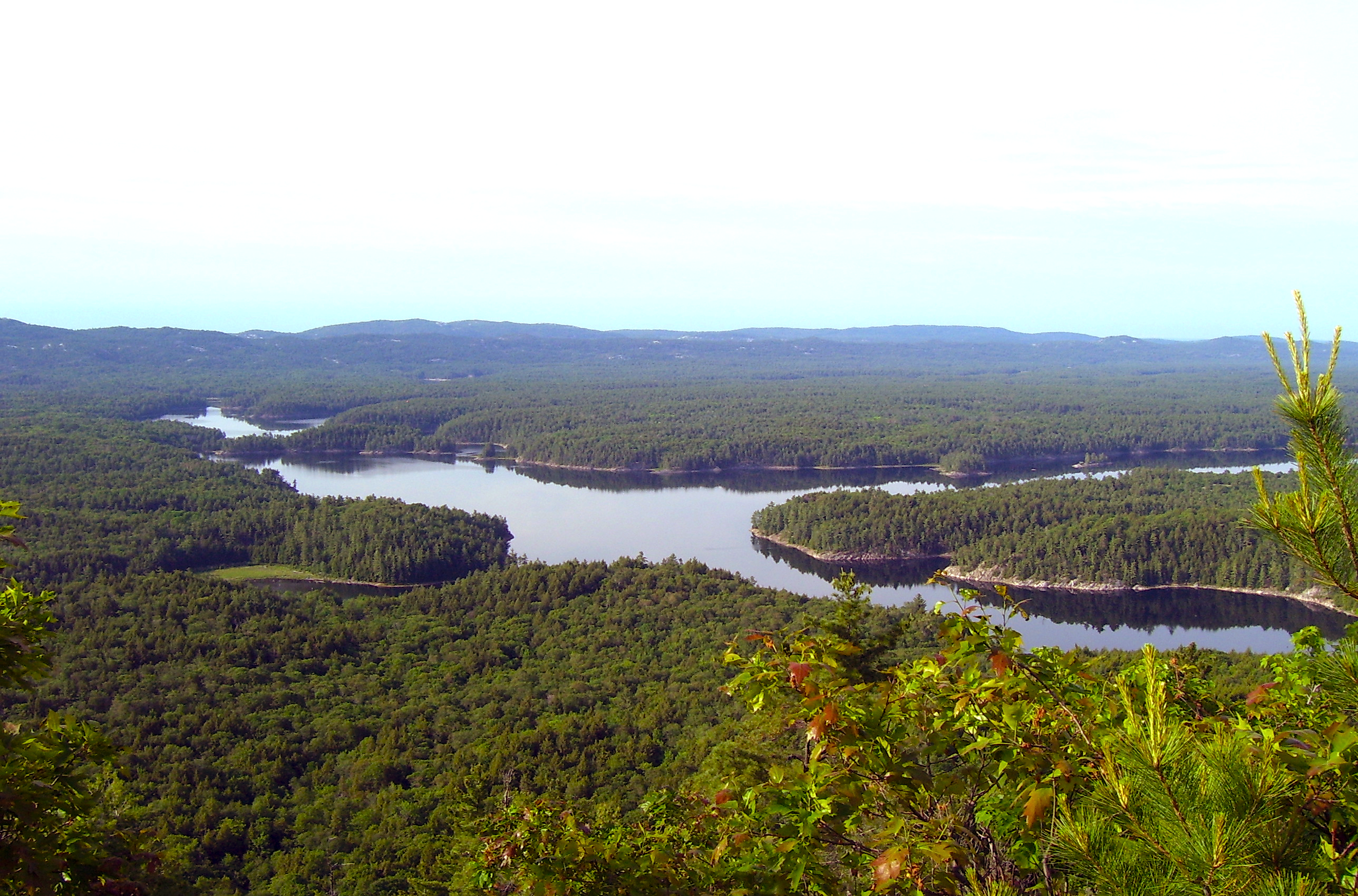
- The view from the Hansen Township section of the trail in the La Cloche mountains.
- Length: 78 km (48 mi)
- Location: Ontario, Canada
- Trailheads: George Lake (park office)
- Use: Hiking, Snowshoeing, Cross-country skiing
- Highest point: Silver Peak, 539 m (1,768 ft)
- Lowest point: Baie Fine, 177 m (581 ft)
- Difficulty: High
- Season: Year-round
- Hazards: Severe weather Black Bear; Mosquitos; Biting flies Steep grades Diarrhea from water

The La Cloche Silhouette Trail is a 78-kilometre (48 mi) backpacking loop across the white quartzite peaks of the La Cloche mountain range. The trail is situated in Killarney Provincial Park, Ontario, Canada. The trail is named for Group of Seven painter Franklin Carmichael's painting "La Cloche Silhouette." Wildlife can be seen throughout the trail - black bears, moose, wolverines, mountain lions, lynx, fishers, snakes, porcupines, beavers, river otters, among other animals, can be encountered at various points along the way.

The trail itself is divided into five sections, individually listed below.

== Baie Fine ==
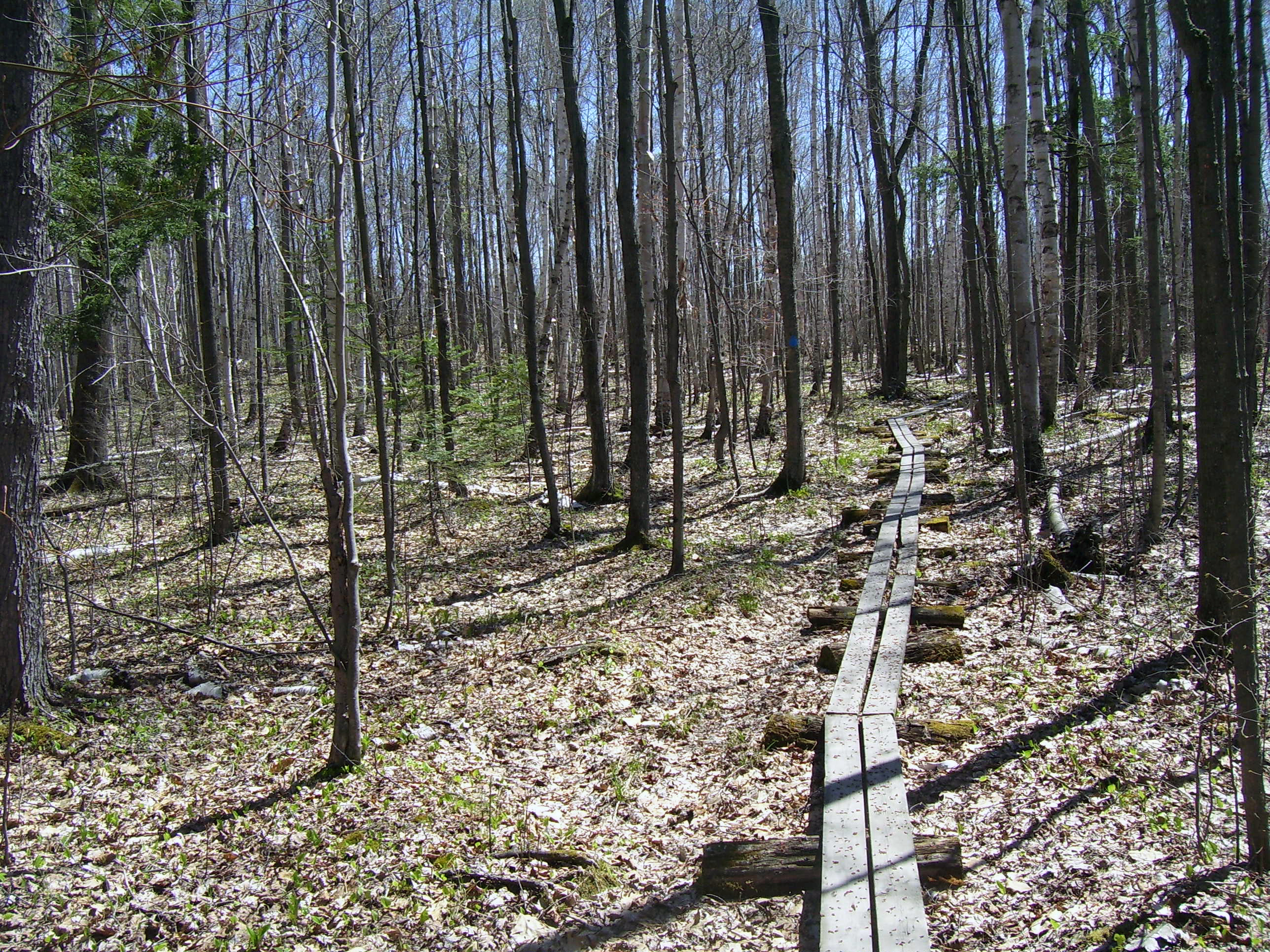
A thin boardwalk running along the Baie Fine section of the trail.

The Baie Fine section runs for 14 kilometres, and is known for its gentle rolling hills, hardwood forests, beaver dams, and pink granite. It begins at the trailhead - a large, informative sign detailing the history of the trail. The forest comprises red and yellow birch, red maple, white pines, and black spruce. The terrain is, for the most part, flat, with a few steep pitches and creek crossings along the way. It concludes with a steep portage up an old logging road that leads to Threenarrows Lake. Local legend has it that the area was once a summer getaway for notorious gangster Al Capone.

== Threenarrows ==
The Threenarrows section is 19 kilometres long, and is named for the sprawling dammed lake that it traces. The trail occasionally runs through cedar forests along the banks of Kirk Creek, but for the most part follows the shoreline of Threenarrows lake as it ascends north into the La Cloche Mountains. The section is a particularly good place to look for wildlife; the low-lying deciduous forests are the perfect hideout for deer, moose, and Ruffed Grouse.

== Hansen Township ==
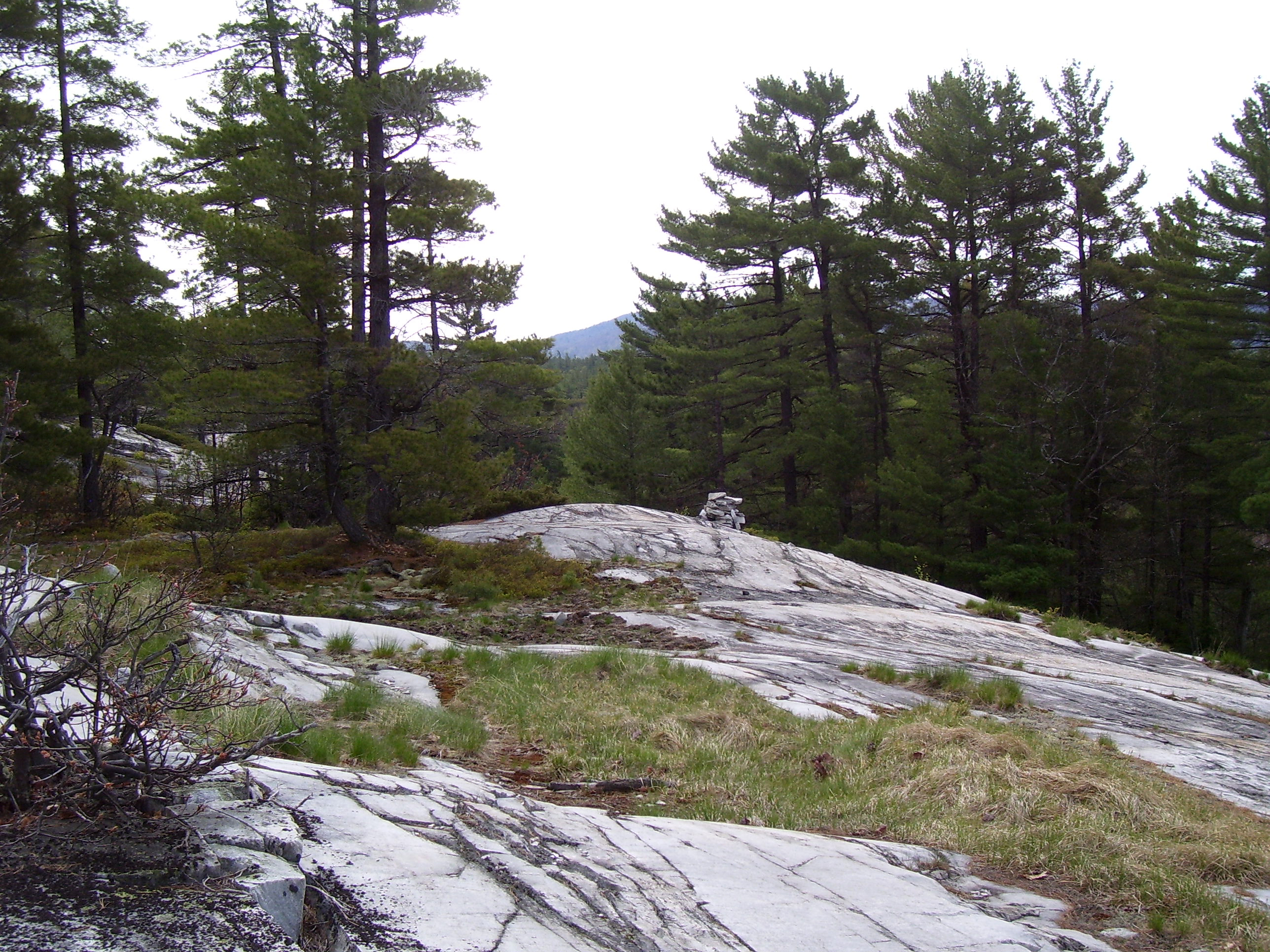
The even terrain of the mountain ridges belies the steep climbs and descents of the Hansen Township section.

The Hansen Township section, at 15 kilometres, has some of the most consistently difficult terrain on the trail, winding its way through the heart of the La Cloche Mountains. It was the last section to be completed, and was finished in 1987, making the trail a complete loop. The steep climbs and challenging descents are well worth the views of the park below - the stark white mountains and acid blue lakes that litter the section are difficult to reach, but are also some of the most beautiful places in the park. The section takes hikers from the main La Cloche mountain range to lower-lying deciduous forests, and was named for Canadian paraplegic athlete Rick Hansen.

A cloudy spring day atop Silver Peak, the highest point of elevation in the park.

== Silver Peak ==
The Silver Peak section is 16 kilometres long, and includes the difficult side trail leading to Silver Peak, the highest point in the entire park (539m above sea level). It is one of the more well-travelled sections of the trail, intersecting with portages and day hike trails as it winds its way into the Killarney ridge, the southern section of the La Cloche mountains. As it ascends into the mountains, the rocks once more turn to exposed quartzite and the lakes regain their bright blue colouring. The Silver Peak Summit trail is a 3.8 kilometer long out-and-back side trail from the main trail.

== Killarney Ridge ==
The clear mountain lakes of the Killarney Ridge turn bright blue in the sun. The lakes are visible in between the mountain at the top of The Crack trail.

The final piece of the trail, assuming clockwise travel, is the Killarney ridge section, at 8 kilometres. The terrain is varied, from rocky ridges and coniferous trees to swamps, and hardwood forests. The stark changes are made possible by a steep descent through "The Crack," an enormous chasm that hikers must carefully navigate in order to leave the mountains. The trail ends where it began, on the picturesque, granite shores of George Lake.

== See also ==
- List of trails in Canada
