= Charlton Lake Camp =

Charlton Lake Camp is a housekeeping cottage resort located in the La Cloche Mountains of northern Ontario, Canada. Dan McGuire and Lisa McGuire are the current owners.

== History ==
The first cottage on the site now known as Charlton Lake Camp, was built by Percy Coones (1878-c1978)in 1935 on an acre of land he purchased from the Willis family for $25. The cottage was known as "The Wigisee". When Percy retired from Inco in 1943 he added three more cottages to rent out to fishermen. The fishing was so good, that Percy began building flatbottomed rowboats which were used by vacationers and fishermen in the area for many years. In 1955 Percy built another cabin "up the Howry" and sold the fishing camp to Tom and Liza Kerr. Percy's Howry Creek cottage was later moved to Bill and Norma Starbuck's site on the south shore of Charlton Lake. Percy lived well into his 90s and is still missed by those who knew him.

Percy Coones sold his fishing camp in 1955 to Tom J (1901-1987) and Liza Collins (1907-1966) Kerr. The Kerrs renamed the camp to "Kerr's Camp" and added nine more cottages with the help of Angus Hollman (1931-2000). Tom and Liza now rest at Hilly Grove Cemetery south of Manitowaning, Ontario. After Liza's death in 1966, Tom Kerr sold the camp to Tom and Barbara Gough. Tom and Barbara carried on the camp tradition until selling the camp to Jim and Susan Bailey in 1972. The Gough's still enjoy the water by having a boat docked on the North Channel of Lake Huron.

Upon their purchase in 1972, the Bailey's bestowed the camp with its current name, Charlton Lake Camp. Jim and Susan are credited with beginning work on the beautiful main house that sits on the site today. The Bailey's made several improvements including a bath/shower house and improved rental fleet. After more than a decade there the Bailey's sold the camp in 1984 to Tom and Gerry Paul. Jim now resides in Espanola, Ontario and Susan lives in Toronto, Ontario.

The Pauls, of Westerville, Ohio, owned the camp for seven years but had it managed by Marg Goodward of Willisville, Ontario in 1984; and by Chuck and Dora Pavlischek from 1985 to 1991 when the Pavlischek's decided to purchase the property. The Pavlischeks made many improvements over the years including flush toilets in all of the cottages and the addition of a canoe fleet. Of particular note, Chuck is credited with the carved pillars that are on the main house and is noted for his hand made paddles which you'll find in many boats around the lakes. In the late 1990s the Pavlischeks sold the camp to Peter and Trudy Hessey.

The Hessey's completed the finish work on the main house as well as made improvements on the cottages. They created new gardens and landscaping adding to the natural beauty that the camp is known for. The Hessey's then sold the camp to Steve and Kathy Holt.

The Holts operated the camp for seven years before moving on to a new venture, selling the camp in 2009 to Lori and Mark Murton.

Lori is a long time summer resident of the area; her family owning their own cottage on Frood Lake since 1941. Mark hails from Michigan but spent several summers working and hiking in Yellowstone, Grand Teton, and Isle Royale National Park and has kayaked many miles in the waters of northern Lake Huron in Michigan's Upper Peninsula. In the spring of 2015 Mark and Lori sold the camp to Dan and Lisa McGuire, who are the current owners.
