= Hyde Memorial Observatory =

Observatory in Nebraska, US

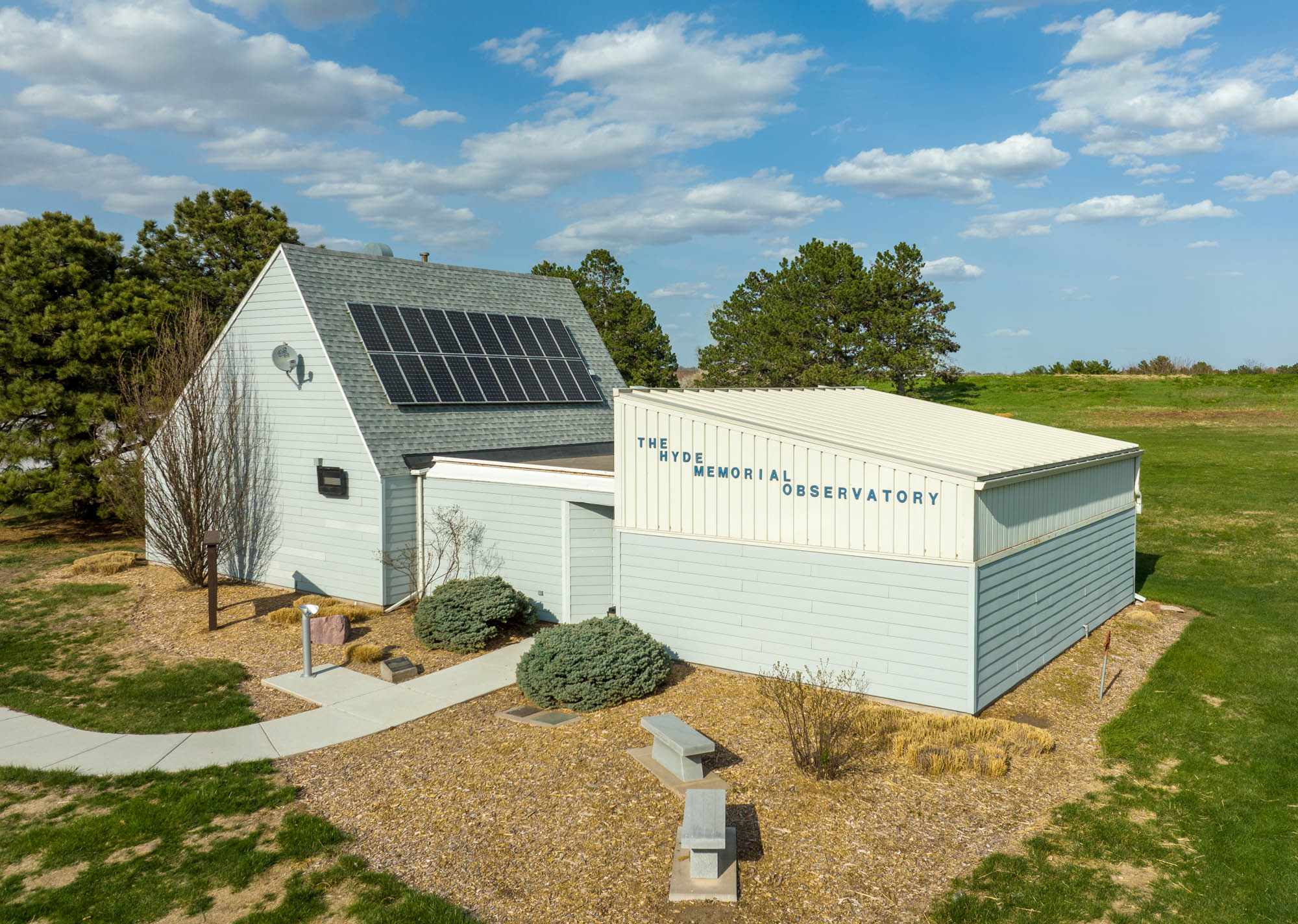
- Hyde Memorial Observatory on April 4, 2022
- Location: Lincoln, Nebraska
- Coordinates: 40°46′40.14″N 96°38′10.41″W
- Established: 1977
- Website: www.hydeobservatory.info

Telescopes
- Telescopes: 14' Schmidt-Cassegrain Celestron, 11' Schmidt-Cassegrain Celestron, 8' Schmidt-Cassegrain Meade Lightswitch, 3' Rear Projection Solar Telescope

The Hyde Memorial Observatory is a volunteer-run community astronomical observatory located in Lincoln, Nebraska near the center of Holmes Lake. It opened in 1977, is furnished through public donations, and is wholly dedicated to the public. It was named for Flora Hydea following a donation in honor of her late husband Leicester.

== See also ==
- List of astronomical observatories
