= Ontario Highway 637 =

Ontario provincial highway

Highway 637

Route information
- Maintained by Ministry of Transportation of Ontario
- Length: 67.7 km (42.1 mi)
- Existed: July 20, 1962–present

Major junctions
- West end: Channel Street in Killarney
- East end: Highway 69 at Rock Bay

Location
- Country: Canada
- Province: Ontario

Highway system
- Ontario provincial highways; Current; Former; 400-series
← Highway 636	→ Highway 638

Secondary Highway 637, commonly referred to as Highway 637 is a provincially maintained secondary highway in the Canadian province of Ontario. Located entirely within Sudbury District, the highway connects Highway 69 to the primary townsite of Killarney, 67.7 kilometres (42.1 mi) away, as well as providing access to Killarney Provincial Park.

The highway was opened in 1962. Prior to its completion, the community of Killarney relied primarily on water transport via Georgian Bay and the North Channel. The route has remained unchanged since then, aside from a very short extension to meet the realigned Highway 69 (future Highway 400) interchange.

== Route description ==
Highway 637 is a long and isolated secondary highway which travels north of Georgian Bay. It begins in the town of Killarney at Channel Street, near the shoreline of the bay. From there it travels eastward through the barren wilderness of the Canadian Shield, passing through lakes, swamps, forests, and rocks on its 67.7-kilometre-long (42.1 mi) journey to Highway 69. The route provides access to Killarney Provincial Park, Atley Central Forest Provincial Conservation Reserve and Atlee Provincial Conservation Reservation. Near the rail siding of Porlock, the highway crosses a Canadian National Railway line. It circles around the northern shore of Kakakiwaganda Lake before ending at an interchange with Highway 69 midway between French River and Sudbury.

Like other provincial routes in Ontario, Highway 637 is maintained by the Ministry of Transportation of Ontario. In 2010, traffic surveys conducted by the ministry at two different locations along the highway showed that on average, 500 vehicles used it daily.

== History ==
Highway 637 was constructed by the Department of Highways (DHO) during the early 1960s to provide access to the resort community of Killarney, which until its construction was inaccessible by regular roads, and relied entirely on water or air transport and winter roads. The highway was opened ceremonially by highway minister William Arthur Goodfellow on July 20, 1962. It cost C$2.5 million (1962) to construct the route.

=== S-Curve ===
Until 2010, the intersection of Highway 637 and Highway 69 was located along a sharp S-curve in Highway 69's alignment around Rock Bay, which rendered the approaching intersection virtually invisible to northbound traffic. An especially serious problem was encountered with trucking traffic; in unsafe weather conditions, large transport trucks often had difficulty navigating the curve correctly, and sometimes veered into oncoming traffic right in front of the Highway 637 intersection. An ongoing series of fatal car accidents, which continued to occur even after the provincial government posted a special warning sign with flashing yellow lights on the curve, was cited by residents of the area as an important factor in favour of the northward extension of Highway 400 to Sudbury.

A dual-phase realignment of Highway 69 at the curve took place between 2008 and 2012. In the first phase, which began in 2008, the four-laned route was built from Rock Bay southward for five kilometres to bypass the curve, following which the future southbound set of lanes was opened to traffic as a temporary two-lane route on July 27, 2010. In the second phase, which began in 2009, the four-lane construction was completed from the end of the existing four-lane segment at Estaire to the northerly end of the realigned route at Highway 637. The completed four-lane route, now including a full interchange with Highway 637, was opened to traffic on August 8, 2012, and the former S-curve alignment of Highway 69 is now a local road named Murdock River Road, while the former alignment of Highway 69 leading north is now an extension of the local road to the military training facility at Burwash. The extension added 200 metres (656.2 ft) to the length of the highway.

== Major intersections ==
The following table lists the major junctions along Highway 637.

Division	Location	km	Destinations	Notes
Sudbury	Killarney	0.0	Channel Street	
Sudbury	Unorganized Sudbury District	67.7	Highway 69 – Sudbury	future Highway 400
