= Killarney Provincial Park =

Provincial park and wilderness area in Ontario, Canada

- IUCN category Ib (wilderness area)
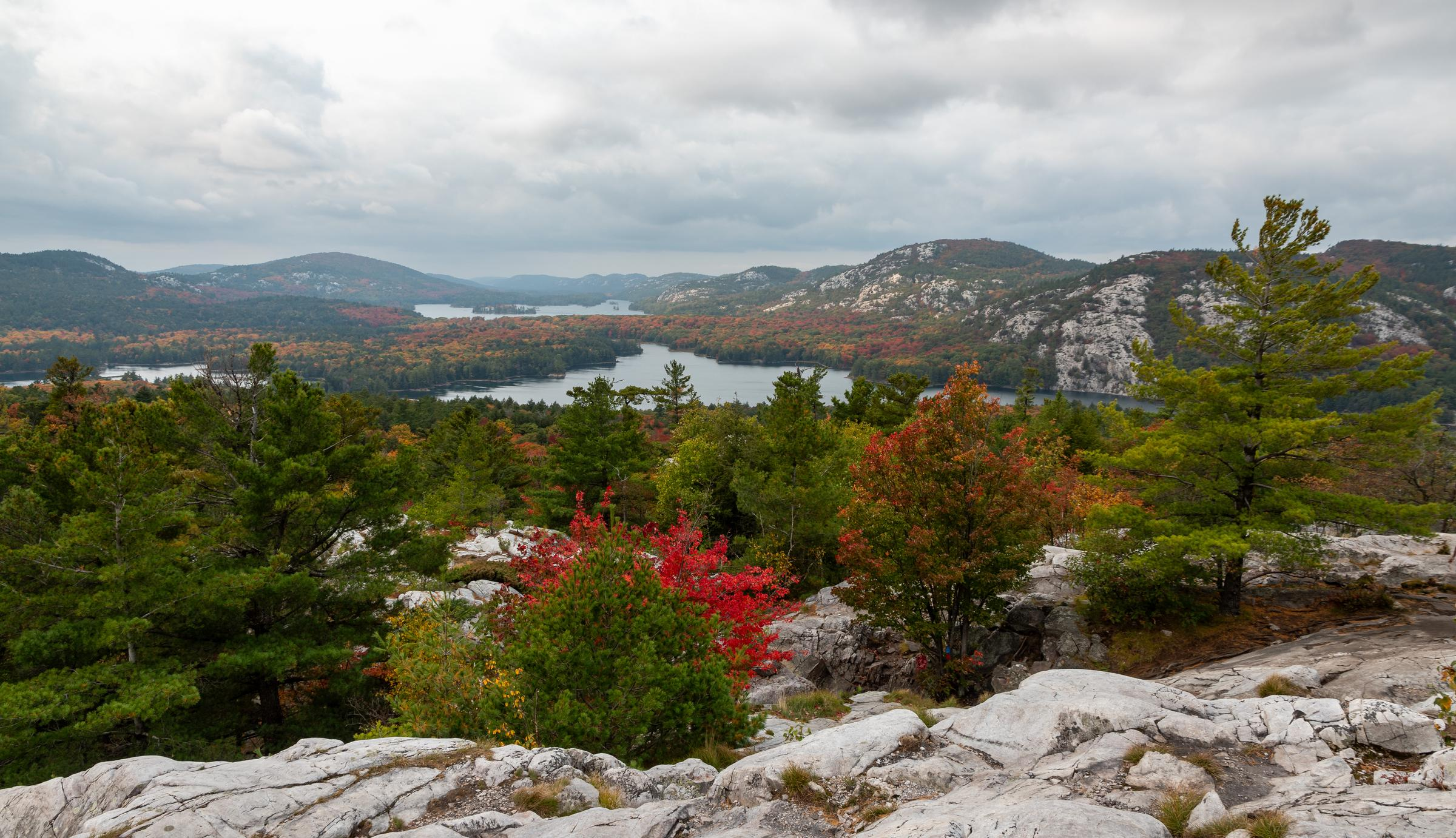
- View overlooking Killarney Lake from The Crack trail terminus

- Location within Ontario
- Interactive map of Killarney Provincial Park
- Location: Sudbury District, Northeastern Ontario, Canada
- Nearest city: Sudbury, Ontario
- Coordinates: 46°07′00″N 81°25′00″W
- Area: 493.25 km^{2} (190.44 sq mi)
- Established: 1964; 62 years ago
- Visitors: 207,820 (in 2022)
- Governing body: Ontario Parks
- Website: https://www.ontarioparks.ca/park/killarney

Killarney Provincial Park is a provincial park in central Ontario, Canada, located approximately 90 km (56 mi) southwest of downtown Sudbury, Ontario.

The park contains just one campground at the George Lake entrance as it is primarily a wilderness park. There are few facilities in order to allow visitors a chance to experience the solitude and beauty of its undisturbed natural setting. It has a number of hiking trails and canoe-in back-country camping. The canoe routes include well maintained portages between lakes. The campground includes six heated yurts which have electric lighting, a power outlet, a propane barbecue and bunk beds.

Situated on the north shore of Georgian Bay in the municipality of Killarney, the park straddles the La Cloche range, large rounded white quartzite hills that dominate the landscape. The white peaks and cliffs contrast with the pine and hardwood forests and the boggy lowlands that surround the park's many lakes.

Quartzite is weather-resistant and contains few nutrient-bearing minerals. Soils, where present, tend to be shallow and infertile. Very stony sandy loam is the most common soil texture reported. Podzol profile development is usual in well-drained situations. Mineral-rich rock types such as diabase and limestone occur locally and the soils that have developed over them support some of the park's more luxuriant vegetation.

The park lies within the Eastern forest-boreal transition ecoregion, so there is a wide variety of plant life. The park is home to: moose, deer, black bears, wolves, lynx, bobcats, martens and beavers along with over 20 species of reptiles and amphibians. Over 100 species of birds breed, nest or rest within park boundaries.

== History and Origin ==
The origin of the park is owed to the conservation efforts of artists. Canadian Group of Seven artist A.Y. Jackson was so alarmed by the prospect that Trout Lake (now, O.S.A. Lake) was about to be logged that he petitioned the Provincial government of the day to have it preserved. His letter was received by William Finlayson, then the Minister of Lands and Forests, resulting in a successful conclusion. The lake was taken into trust by the Ontario Society of Artists and its name was changed to O.S.A. Lake. Jackson's efforts were rewarded with the naming of a lake after him on his 90th birthday. The hills and lakes in the Killarney area became a popular place for painting and sketching and over the years several other members of the Group of Seven worked there, including Franklin Carmichael, Arthur Lismer and A.J. Casson. In 1959, the Killarney Park area was set aside as a wilderness preserve. In 1962, Highway 637 opened, connecting the north shore of Georgian Bay all the way from the town of Killarney to the Trans-Canada Highway. Finally in 1964, with the help of lobbying efforts by the Group of Seven, 4,000 square miles (10,000 km^{2}) of Georgian Bay shoreline were set aside as a wilderness reserve, and Killarney became a provincial park.

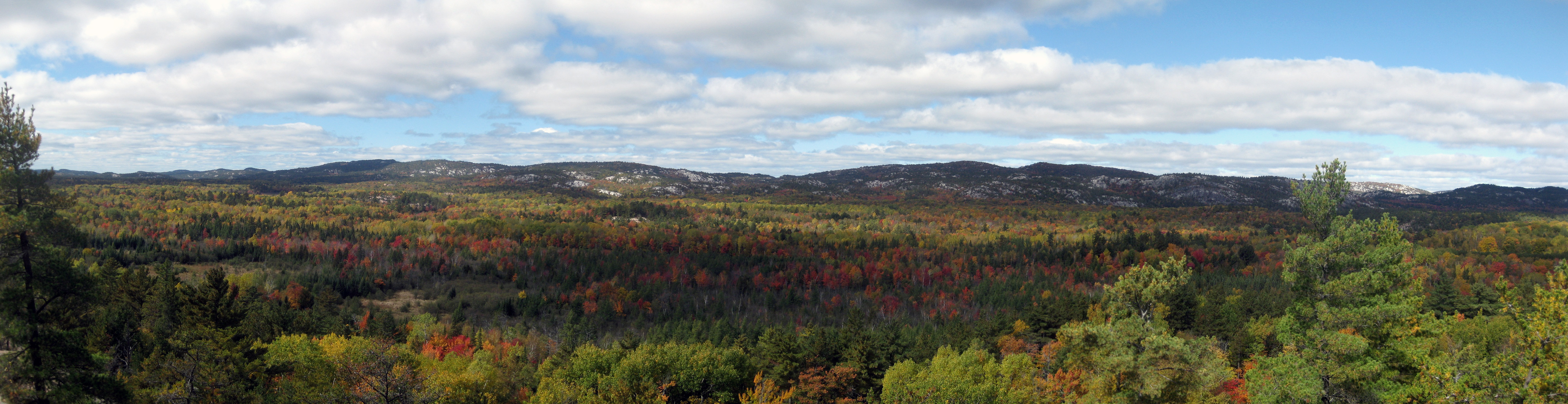
Panoramic view from the Granite Ridge Trail

The park has experienced some challenges that threaten the health of its delicate local ecosystems. Owing in large part to its proximity to Sudbury with its nickel mines and smelters, local lakes were damaged by acid rain. Pollution caused by the smelting activities associated with nickel mining between the 1940s and the 1970s, caused many of Killarney's lakes to become acidified, resulting in the loss of fish species, algae and aquatic plant life in many of the lakes. This damage was especially severe in the quartzite areas. Legislation passed in the 1970s forced the industry to improve its emissions standards. Since then, sulphur emissions have been reduced by over 90%. To date, water quality has improved in some lakes to pre-pollution levels, while in other lakes the slow process of biological recovery continues. More recently, the lakes have been under threat from non-indigenous invasive species, such as the Bythotrephes longimanus (a.k.a. spiny water flea), which threaten local species.

In 2006, the provincial government also created the adjacent but separate provincial park of Killarney Lakelands and Headwaters. In 2015, the Wiikwemkoong First Nation on Manitoulin Island also established the adjacent Point Grondine Park on their own unoccupied heritage territory in the area.

== Observatory ==
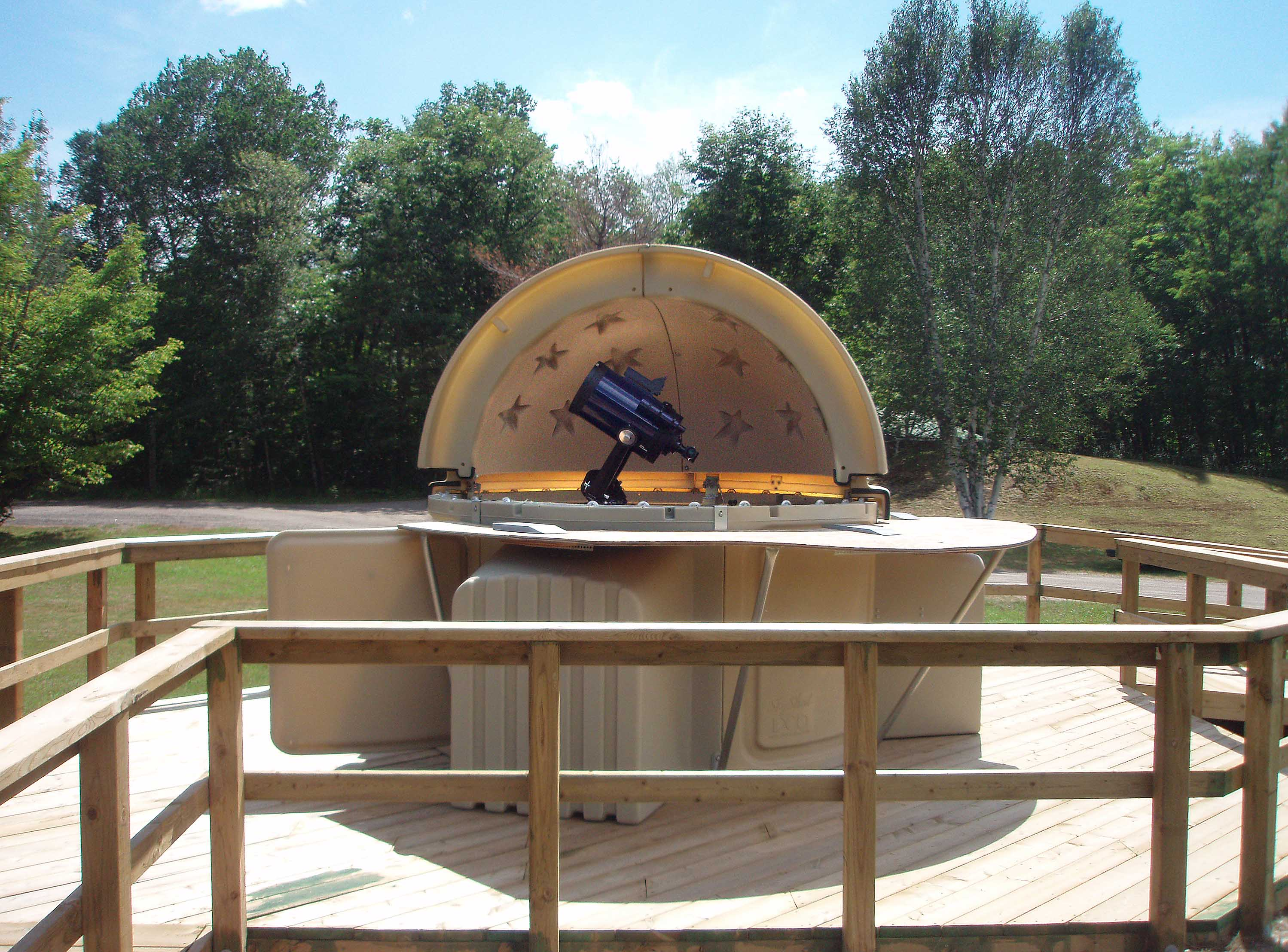
Killarney Provincial Park Observatory

On July 17, 2010 the park officially opened the Killarney Provincial Park Observatory – the first public observatory in any Ontario Provincial Park. This observatory is available for both NHE directed programs as well as individual use. As the skies in Killarney Provincial Park are still pristine, this facility is ideal for all those interested in studying the night sky.

=== Dark-Sky Preserve ===
In 2018, Killarney Provincial Park was awarded the Royal Astronomical Society of Canada's Dark-Sky Preserve designation, the first Ontario Park to do so.

=== 2018 Upgrade ===
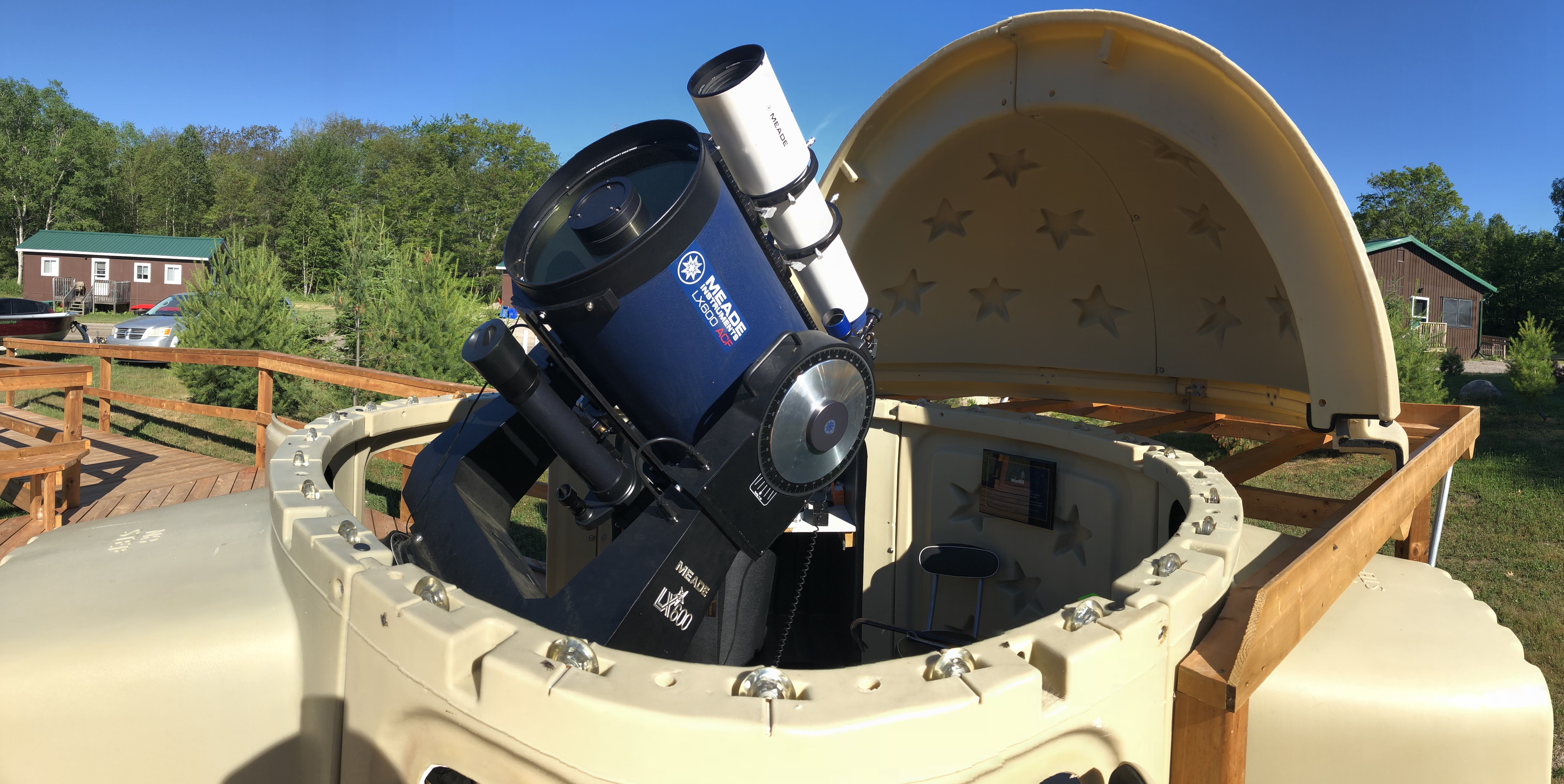
KPPO Dome 2 with Dome Off-2

In celebration of 125 years of Ontario Parks and 150 years of the Royal Astronomical Society of Canada, the Killarney Provincial Park Observatory complex was upgraded to include a new observatory facility. This one includes a 16" fully automated Meade LX600 (primary instrument) and a Meade 130mm (5") apochromatic refractor (secondary instrument).

== See also ==
- List of Ontario Parks
- La Cloche Silhouette Trail
