= Willisville & Whitefish Falls, Ontario =

Coordinates: 46.121802°N 81.732883°W

Willisville & Whitefish Falls is an unincorporated community in Ontario, Canada. It is recognized as a designated place by Statistics Canada.

== Demographics ==
In the 2021 Census of Population conducted by Statistics Canada, Willisville & Whitefish Falls had a population of 321 living in 159 of its 357 total private dwellings, a change of 12.2% from its 2016 population of 286. With a land area of 158.61 km^{2} (61.24 sq mi), it had a population density of 2.0/km^{2} (5.2/sq mi) in 2021.

== See also ==
- List of communities in Ontario
- List of designated places in Ontario
