= Franklin Carmichael =

20th-century Canadian artist

Franklin Carmichael RCA
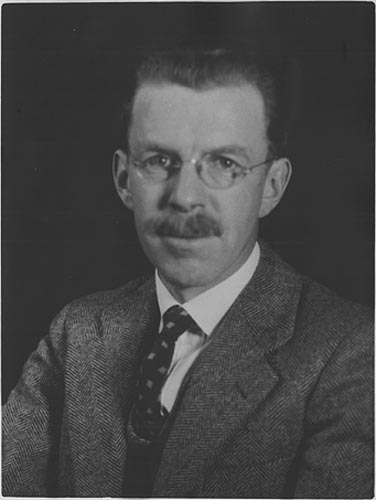
- Frank Carmichael, 1930
- Born: May 4, 1890; Orillia, Ontario, Canada
- Died: October 24, 1945 (aged 55); Toronto, Ontario, Canada
- Resting place: Saint Andrews and Saint James Cemetery, Orillia; 44°37′N 79°26′W
- Education: Ontario College of Art
- Known for: Painter
- Movement: Group of Seven
- Spouse: Ada Lillian Went (m. 1915)
- Elected: Royal Canadian Academy of Arts

Franklin Carmichael RCA (May 4, 1890 – October 24, 1945) was a Canadian artist and member of the Group of Seven. Though he was primarily famous for his use of watercolours, he also used oil paints, charcoal and other media to capture the Ontario landscapes. Besides his work as a painter, he worked as a designer and illustrator, creating promotional brochures, advertisements in newspapers and magazines, and designing books. Near the end of his life, Carmichael taught in the Graphic Design and Commercial Art Department at the Ontario College of Art (today the Ontario College of Art & Design University).

The youngest original member of the Group of Seven, Carmichael often found himself socially on the outside of the group. Despite this, the art he produced was of equal measure in terms of style and approach to the other members' contributions, vividly expressing his spiritual views through his art. The next youngest member was A. J. Casson with whom he was friendly.

== Biography ==
=== Early years ===
Franklin Carmichael was born in 1890 in Orillia, Ontario, the son of David Graham and Susannah Eleanor (Smith) Carmichael. Because his artistic talents were already apparent at a very young age, his mother enrolled him in both music and art lessons.

As a teenager, Carmichael worked in his father's carriage making shop as a striper. In decorating the carriages he practiced his design, drawing, and colouring skills.

=== Emerging artist (1910–1920) ===
In 1910, at the age of twenty, Carmichael arrived in Toronto and entered the Ontario College of Art, where he studied with William Cruickshank and George Reid. Among his fellow students was Gustav Hahn.

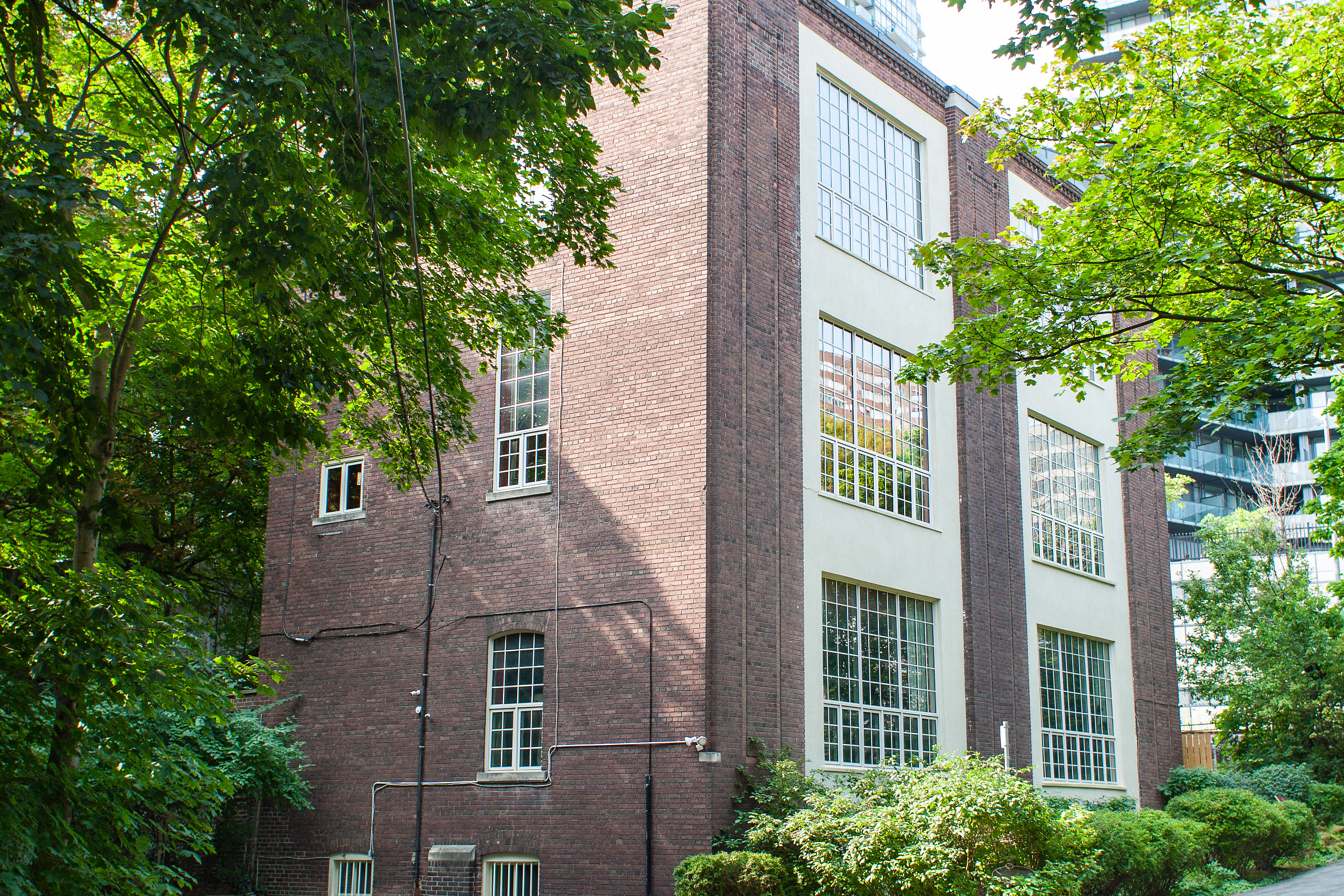
The Studio Building in Toronto where Carmichael shared a space with Tom Thomson

By 1911, he began working as an apprentice at Grip Ltd. making $2.50 a week. Late in the year, Lawren Harris and J. E. H. MacDonald began sketching together, soon to be joined by Carmichael and his coworkers at Grip, including Arthur Lismer, Tom Thomson and Frank Johnston. By 1913, the excursions also included Frederick Varley and A.Y. Jackson.

Carmichael moved to Antwerp, Belgium in 1913 to study painting at Académie Royale des Beaux-Arts. Due to the outbreak of World War I, he cut his studies short and returned to his native Ontario in September 1914, rejoining Thomson, Macdonald, Lismer, Varley and Johnston. Staying in Toronto during the war, they struggled in the depressed wartime economy. (Note: Jackson enlisted in June 1915 and served in France from November 1915 to 1917, at which point he was seriously injured. Harris enlisted in 1916 at taught musketry at Camp Borden. He was discharged in May 1918 after suffering a nervous breakdown. Carmichael, along with MacDonald, Thomson, Varley and Johnston remained in Toronto. For a thorough discussion of the activity of the group during the war, refer to Mellen (1970), p. 70; Larisey (1993), pp. 34–36; Reid (1971), pp. 109–120)

During the fall of 1914, he moved into the Studio Building and shared a space with Thomson over the winter.

Carmichael and the members of the group were frustrated by their initial attempts to capture the untouched "savage" land of Canada, with the particular characteristics of the land difficult to represent in the European tradition. Jackson would write that, "after painting in Europe where everything was mellowed by time and human associations, I found it a problem to paint a country in outward appearance pretty much as it had been when Champlain passed through its thousands of rock islands three hundred years before."

It would be only after the group discovered the paintings of Scandinavian landscapes that they would begin to move in a coherent direction. According to MacDonald, the Scandinavian painters "seemed to be a lot of men not trying to express themselves so much as trying to express something that took hold of themselves. The painters began with nature rather than with art."

Thomson invited Carmichael on a sketching trip to Algonquin Park in the fall of 1915. Carmichael could not go because of his September 15 marriage to Ada Lillian Went.

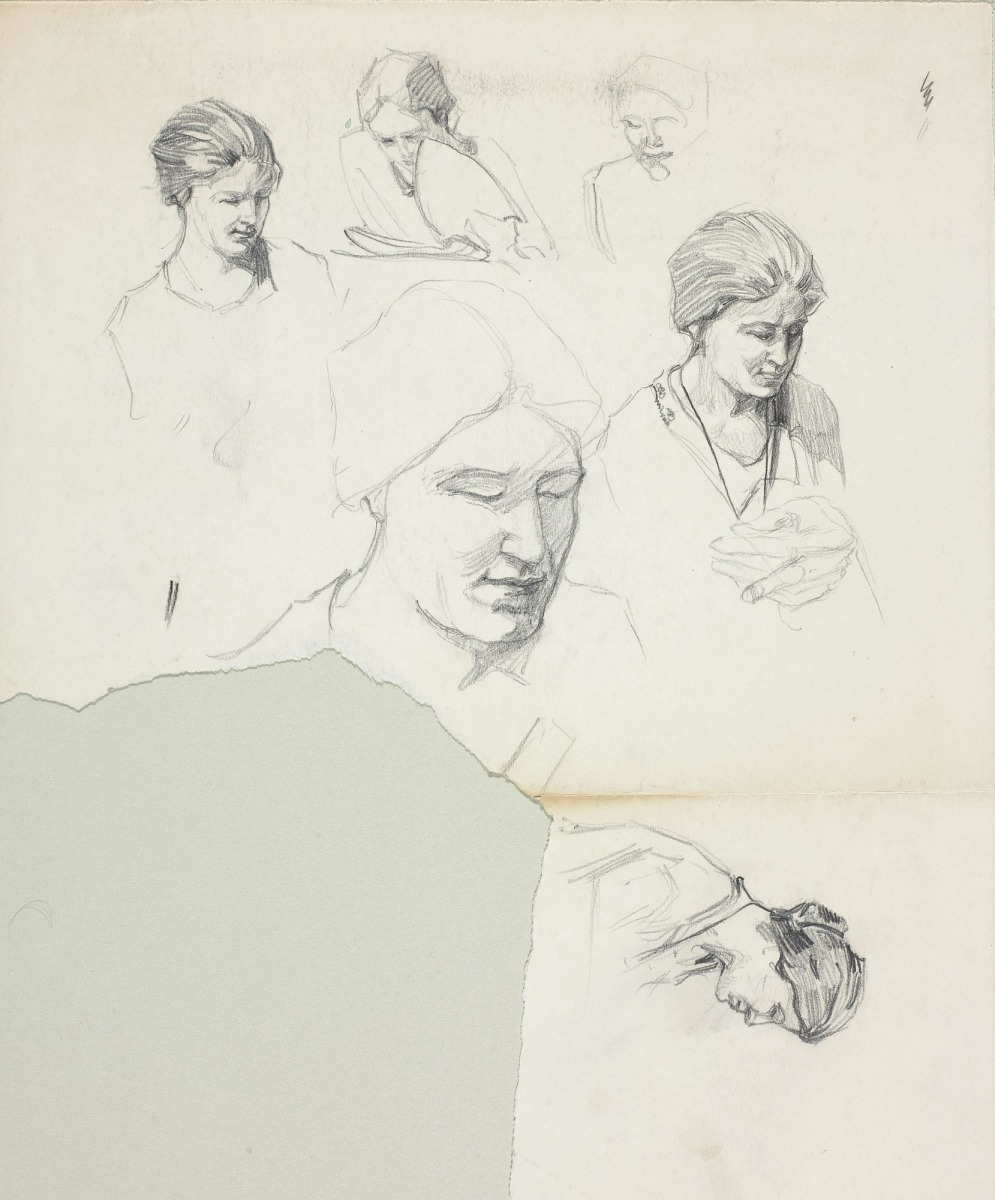
Studies by Carmichael of his wife, Ada Carmichael (née Lillian Went), c. 1925–1935, National Gallery of Canada, Ottawa

=== Group of Seven (1920–1932) ===
In April 1920, the Group of Seven was established by Jackson, Harris, MacDonald, Lismer, Varley, Johnston and Carmichael. The group held its first exhibition at the Art Gallery of Ontario in Toronto from May 7 to 27, 1920.

In 1922, Carmichael joined the Sampson-Matthews firm, a printmaking business. He likely worked as head designer under the art directorship of J.E. Sampson.

In 1925, Carmichael, Harris and Jackson ventured to the northern shore of Lake Superior. On the trip, Carmichael opted to use watercolour rather than his usual oil paints. He used watercolour consistently from this point onward, painting some of his most famous works with the medium. After this initial experience, he would return several more times to the lake, including in 1926 and 1928. This area on Lake Superior as well as the Northern shore of Lake Huron in the La Cloche mountains would be consistent themes in his work.

According to writer Peter Mellen, the considerably young Carmichael and A. J. Casson "always remained slightly on the fringes of the Group" due to the age gap between them and the other members. Together with F. H. Brigden, Carmichael and Casson founded the Canadian Society of Painters in Water Colour (in French: La Société Canadienne de Peintres en Aquarelle), in 1925

==== Theosophy and spiritual influences ====
The entire group – but Carmichael in particular – strove to give visual form to spiritual value, with some members drawing on theosophy (an offshoot of transcendentalism) and the spiritualist founder of the Theosophical Society, Helena Blavatsky. Theosophy was "predicated on the centrality of intuition as an inclusive but not exclusive tool, and on an individual, emotive approach to divinity. This divinity was immanent, indwelling, permanently pervading the universe."

According to the doctrine of theosophy, a northern "spiritual, cultural, and aesthetic renaissance" was to take place in North America, with Canada playing a particularly special role because of its location. The northern emphasis provided by Theosophy appealed to the "land-based nationalism" of the Group of Seven, expressed particularly by Carmichael, Lismer and MacDonald. (Note: Lismer and Harris were the only official members of the Theosophical Society.) In 1926, Harris published an article, "Revelation of Art in Canada," that appeared in the Canadian Theosophist. In it, Harris wrote,

We (Canadians) are on the fringe of the great North and its living whiteness, its loneliness and replenishment, its resignations and release, its call and answer, its cleansing rhythms. It seems that the top of the continent is a source of spiritual flow that will ever shed clarity on the growing American race, and we Canadians being closest to this source seem destined to produce an art somewhat different from our Southern fellows, an art more spacious, of a greater living quiet, perhaps of a certain conviction of eternal values. We were not placed between the southern teeming of men and the ample, replenishing North for nothing.

Harris further elaborated in another article:

The source of our art then is not in the achievements of other artists in other days and lands, although it has learned a great deal from these. Our art is founded on a long and growing love and understanding of the North in an ever clearer experience of oneness with the informing spirit of the whole land and a strange brooding sense of Mother Nature fostering a new race and a new age [...] So the Canadian artist was drawn north.

The Group's views were not restricted to theosophy, however, but were also influenced by the European Symbolists, Irish nationalist George Russell (Æ) and transcendentalists like Henry David Thoreau and Ralph Waldo Emerson.

=== Move from commercial art to teaching (1932–1945) ===
By 1932, he left commercial art and taught as the head of the Graphic Design and Commercial Art Department the Ontario College of Art until his death in 1945. Following the Group of Seven's disbandment in 1933, Carmichael helped to found the Canadian Group of Painters, which several members of the Group of Seven would later join. After the split, the artistic strength of the other Group of Seven members seemed to diminish, though Carmichael has been noted (along with Harris) as persisting in his strength.

His fondness for the La Cloche Mountains of Ontario led him to build a log cabin on Cranberry Lake in 1934–1935.

Carmichael died suddenly of a heart attack while returning home from the Ontario College of Art on October 24, 1945. He is buried at St. Andrew's and St. James Cemetery in Orillia, Ontario.

== Style and works ==
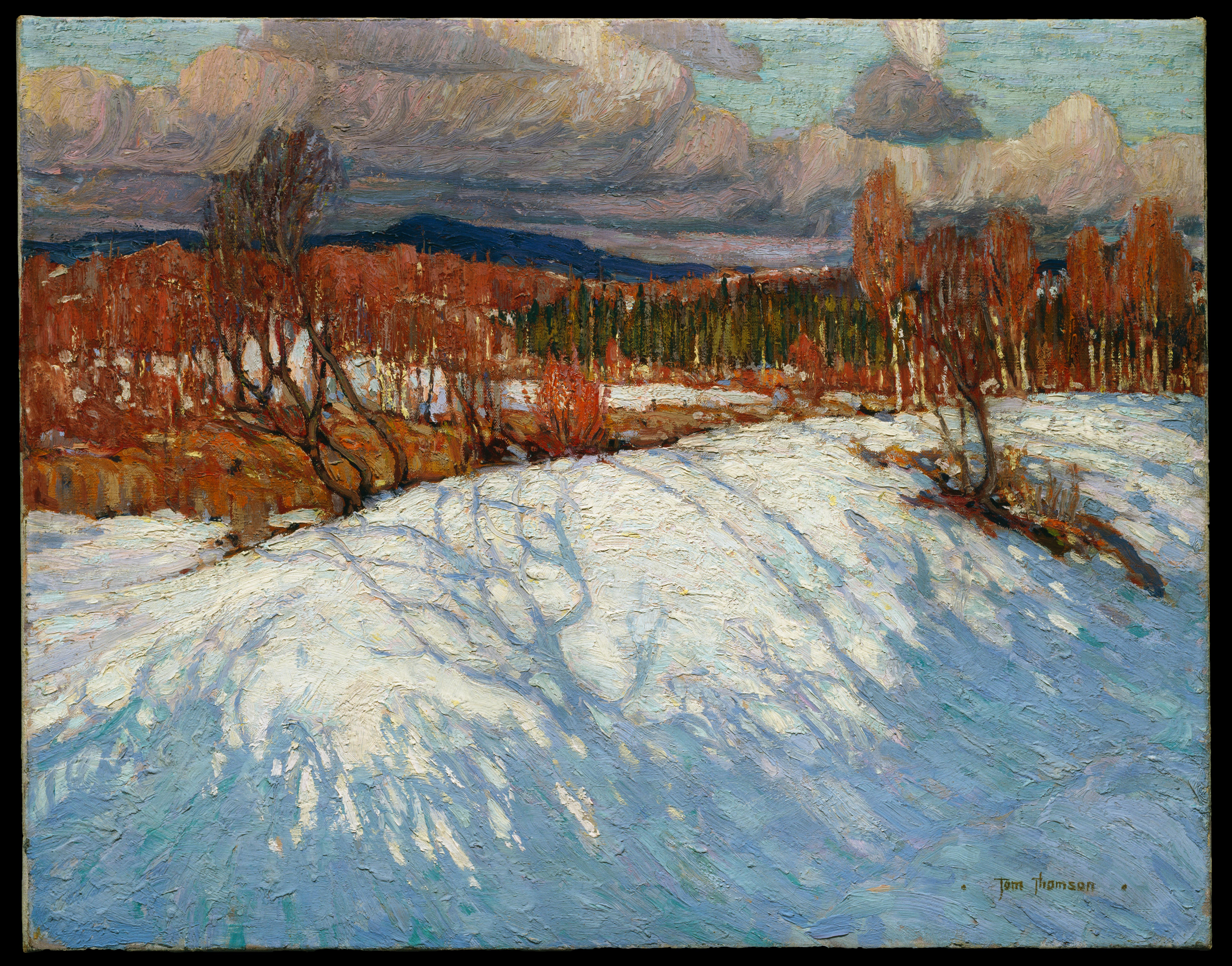
Tom Thomson, In Algonquin Park, Winter 1914–15. 63.2 × 81.1 cm (24 7/8 × 3115/16 in). McMichael Canadian Art Collection, Kleinburg

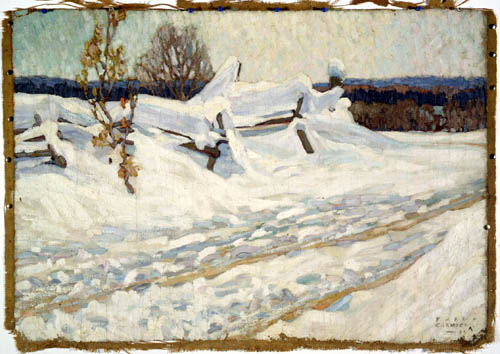
Franklin Carmichael, A Muskoka Road, 1915. 70.2 x 101.9 cm (27 5/8 × 40 1/8 in.). McMichael Canadian Art Collection, Kleinburg

The art historian Joan Murray compares Tom Thomson's In Algonquin Park (left) with Carmichael's A Muskoka Road (right), particularly in how Carmichael "[imitates] the indeterminately foliated but defined trunks of Thomson's early work."

Carmichael's artistic breakthrough came after his return to Canada in 1914, once he took up residence with Thomson in the Studio Building. In the winter of that year, he recorded outdoor sketches and produced one of his first major works, A Muskoka Road. The scene depicted in the painting is that of a snowy road, illustrating his broad handling and bold brushwork. Art historian Joan Murray wrote that "Thomson's way of painting strongly influenced Carmichael." The influence of Thomson can be seen in Carmichael's initial attempts at capturing clouds and snow; his early efforts show he did not yet understand structure and colour on the same level as Thomson.

Carmichael eventually came to favour landscape art, and many of his pieces display an effort to achieve rich colour and design. Besides a few studies in his notes, he produced only a single portrait in oil on canvas in his entire career: Woman in Black Hat, a rendering of an unidentified subject from 1939. Art historian David Silcox praised the painting, writing that it "makes one wish that [Carmichael] had tackled more."

Carmichael's final painting, Gambit No. 1, was painted in 1945 and was his only abstract piece. It was his first major canvas since 1942. Art historian Joyce Zemans thought the painting indicated Carmichael was moving in a new direction, though given the timing of the work at the end of his life it is difficult to know whether he would have continued. Montreal artist Kristine Moran wrote favourably of the painting, understanding "Carmichael's desire to push out from under the constraints of the Post-Impressionist landscape style for which the Group of Seven was so well known." Joan Murray was less enthused with the work, writing, "Abstraction was not Carmichael's game and this painting, so influenced by [Lawren] Harris, is not good."

=== Landscape ===
Famous for his watercolours, Carmichael was a passionate landscape painter. Many of his paintings depict the trees, rocks, hills, and mountains of Ontario. His earlier works had flat juxtapositions of colour, but as he matured through the 1920s he emphasized depth and three dimensional space. Early works like the 1920 painting Autumn Hillside display pictorial motifs that became common to his later work. For example, he utilizes effects of distant weather and a partially shadowed foreground. Carmichael's developing maturity is seen in perhaps his most famous work, The Upper Ottawa, Near Mattawa. The painting shows an understanding of the distinct, massive geometric surfaces of rocks, and is also presented from a viewpoint that would come to characterize much of his later work, utilizing height to emphasize time and weather.

Beyond simple representation of picturesque views, Carmichael attempted to capture contrast. This is seen in his early work Autumn Foliage Against Grey Rock which compares the rocky landscape to a bright autumnal tree along with a pink and green sky.

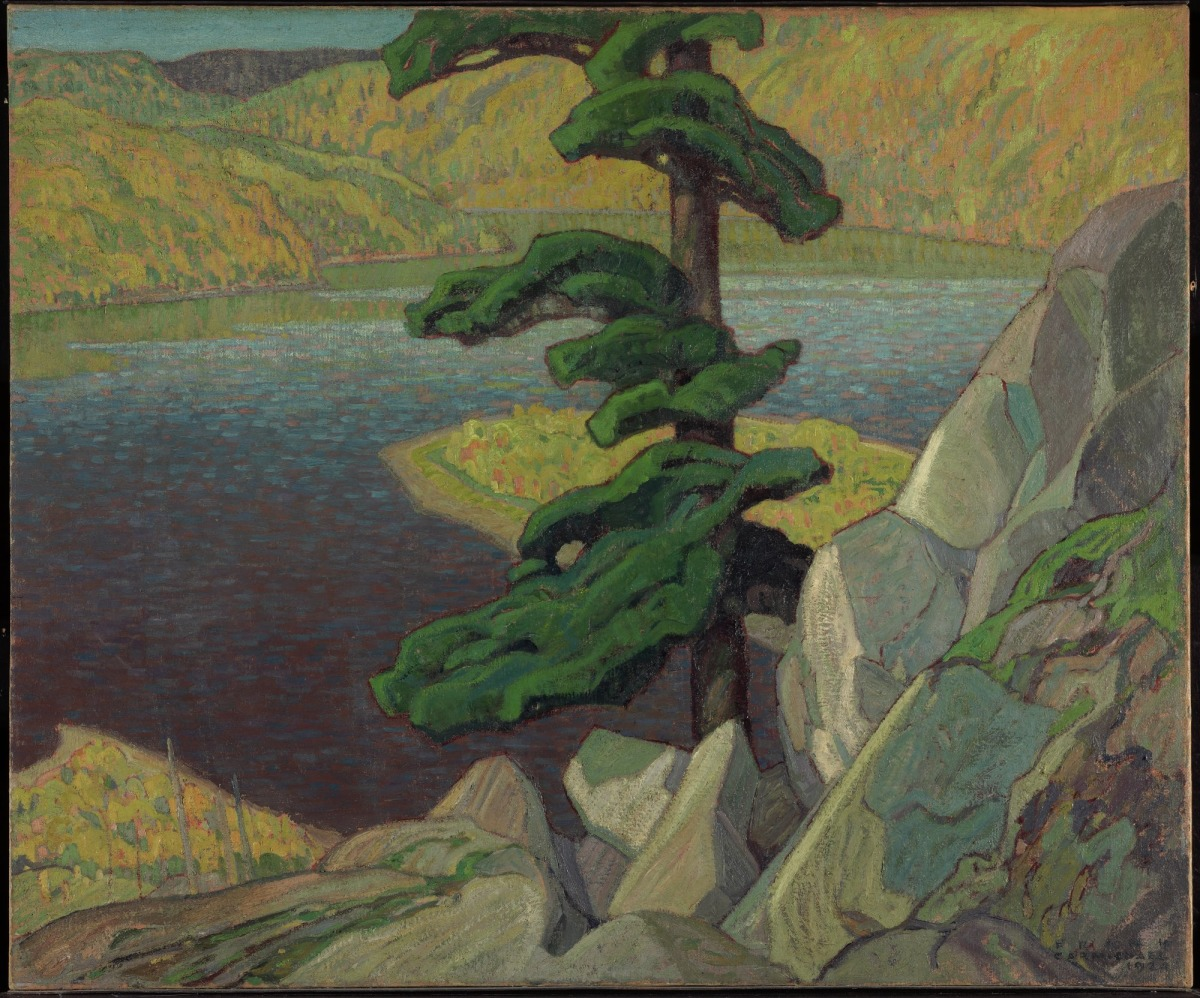
The Upper Ottawa, near Mattawa, 1924, National Gallery of Canada, Ottawa

After Carmichael's ventures to Lake Superior in the mid-to-late 1920s, Bertram Brooker and other friends recognized the spiritual dimensions of his work. Besides his interest theosophy, he also studied transcendentalism, owning a copy of Ralph Waldo Emerson's Essays and Other Writings, amongst many other books. During this time, he made significant changes in style through bolder use of colour and an overall simplification in approach. This is evident in his 1930 watercolour, Snow Flurries: North Shore of Lake Superior, a painting Joan Murray describes as "an almost breathtaking achievement". The work which contrasts the dark blue-green simplified hills against the clouds above. Further comparison has been drawn between this painting and Harris' work from Lake Superior. Similarly, in the 1931 oil painting Bay of Islands From Mt. Burke, he illuminates the foreground with a burst of light. From this light, patches of green, brown, gold and orange indicate the areas of the hill where vegetation lay.

From 1924 on, Carmichael painted the La Cloche Mountains, located in northern Ontario, above Lake Huron, and he expressed his admiration for the "humped contours", white quartzite rock and long stretches of water. This is seen in Lake Wabagishik, the first area he painted in the mountains in which there is no evidence of previous human presence. The painting itself depicts a storm, with rain falling on the distant hills and the wind blowing both the water and trees. In 1935, he bought five acres of land on Cranberry Lake and built a cabin there and then could paint the area at all times of day but storms and other weather phenomena remained a favourite subject of his work. One such example is Snow Clouds from 1938, which communicates a tension between the land and the snow storm approaching from the distance.

== Watercolours ==
Carmichael preferred to depict his outdoor subjects in watercolour. He believed in the independent validity to the medium, and believed them to be equal to oil painting. He co-founded the Canadian Society of Painters in Water Colour in 1925, in an effort to give the medium the importance and recognition it deserved. He said of the medium:

It is capable of responding to the slightest variation of effect or mood. It can be at once clean cut, sharp, delicate and forceful or subtle, brilliant or sombre, including all of the variations that lie in between.

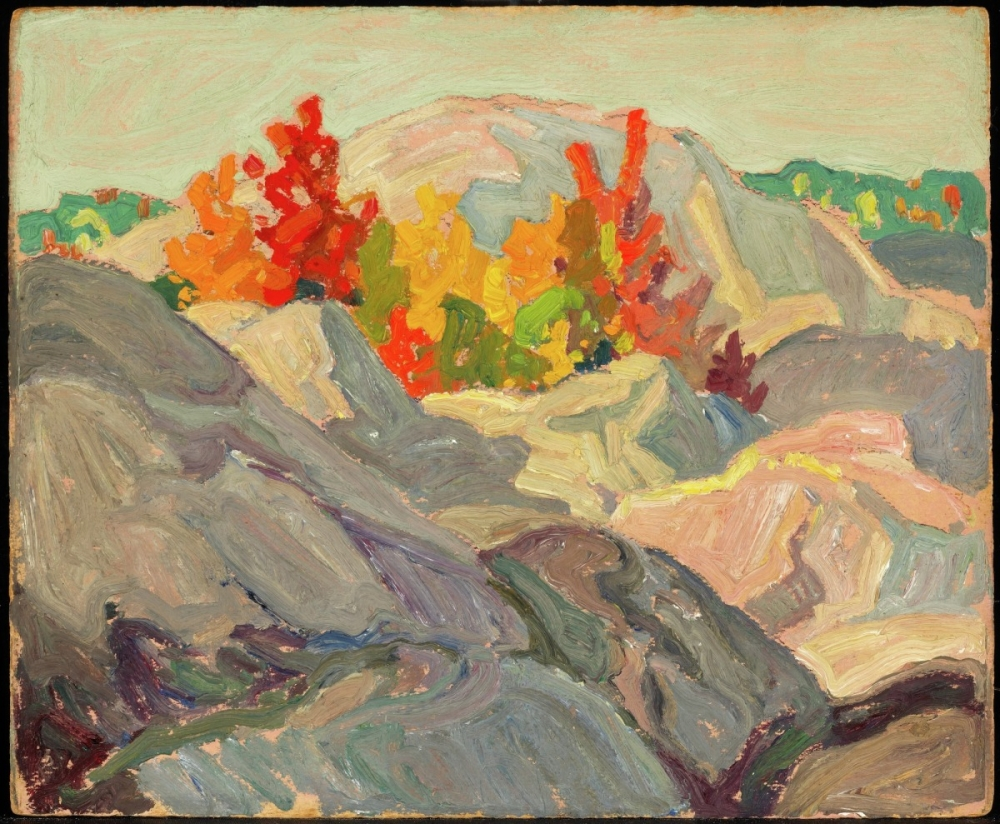
Autumn Foliage against Grey Rock, 1920, National Gallery of Canada, Ottawa

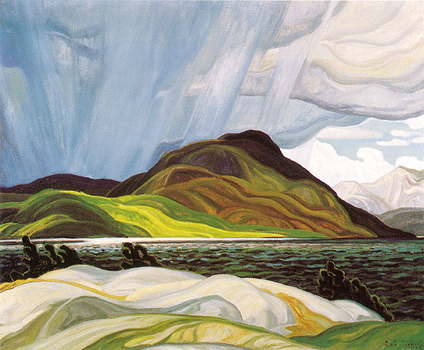
Lake Wabagishik, 1928, McMichael Canadian Art Collection, Kleinburg

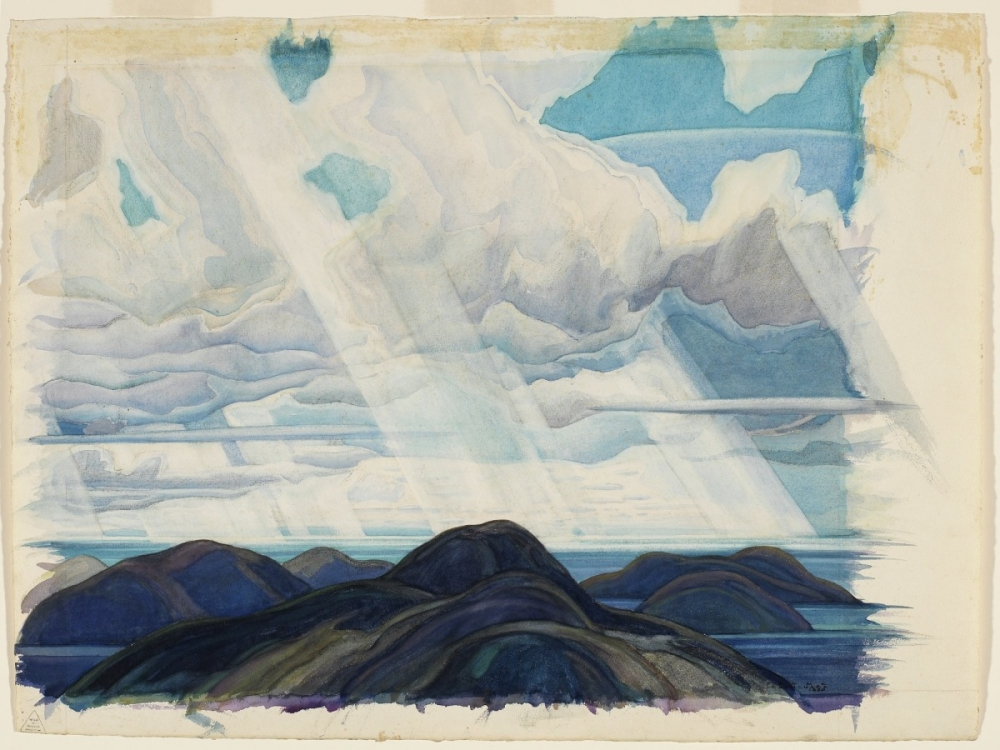
Snow Flurries, North Shore of Lake Superior, 1930, National Gallery of Canada, Ottawa

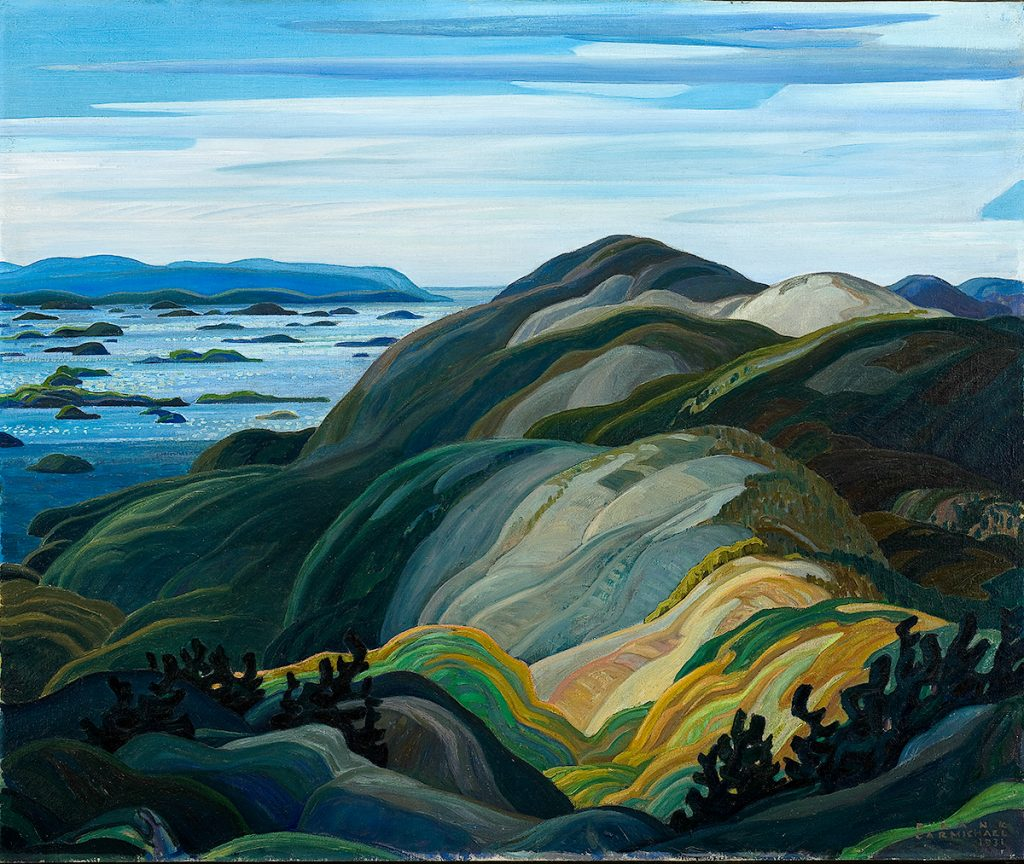
Bay of Islands from Mt. Burke, 1931, McMichael Canadian Art Collection, Kleinburg

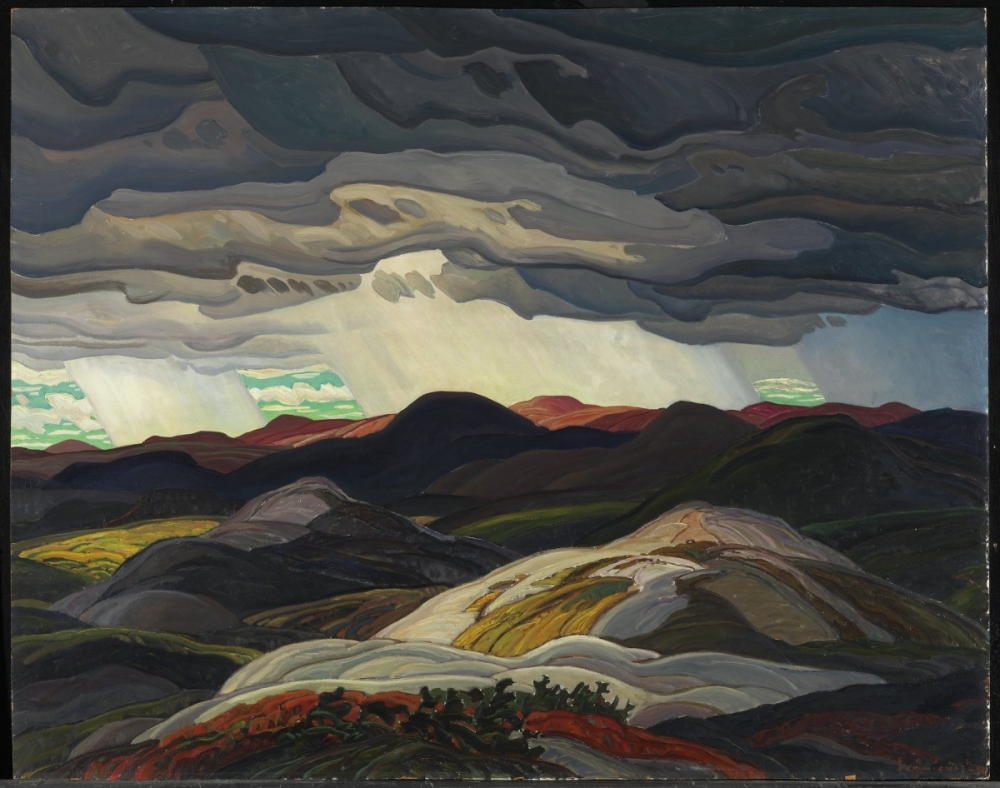
Snow Clouds, 1938, National Gallery of Canada, Ottawa

=== Industry and the environment ===
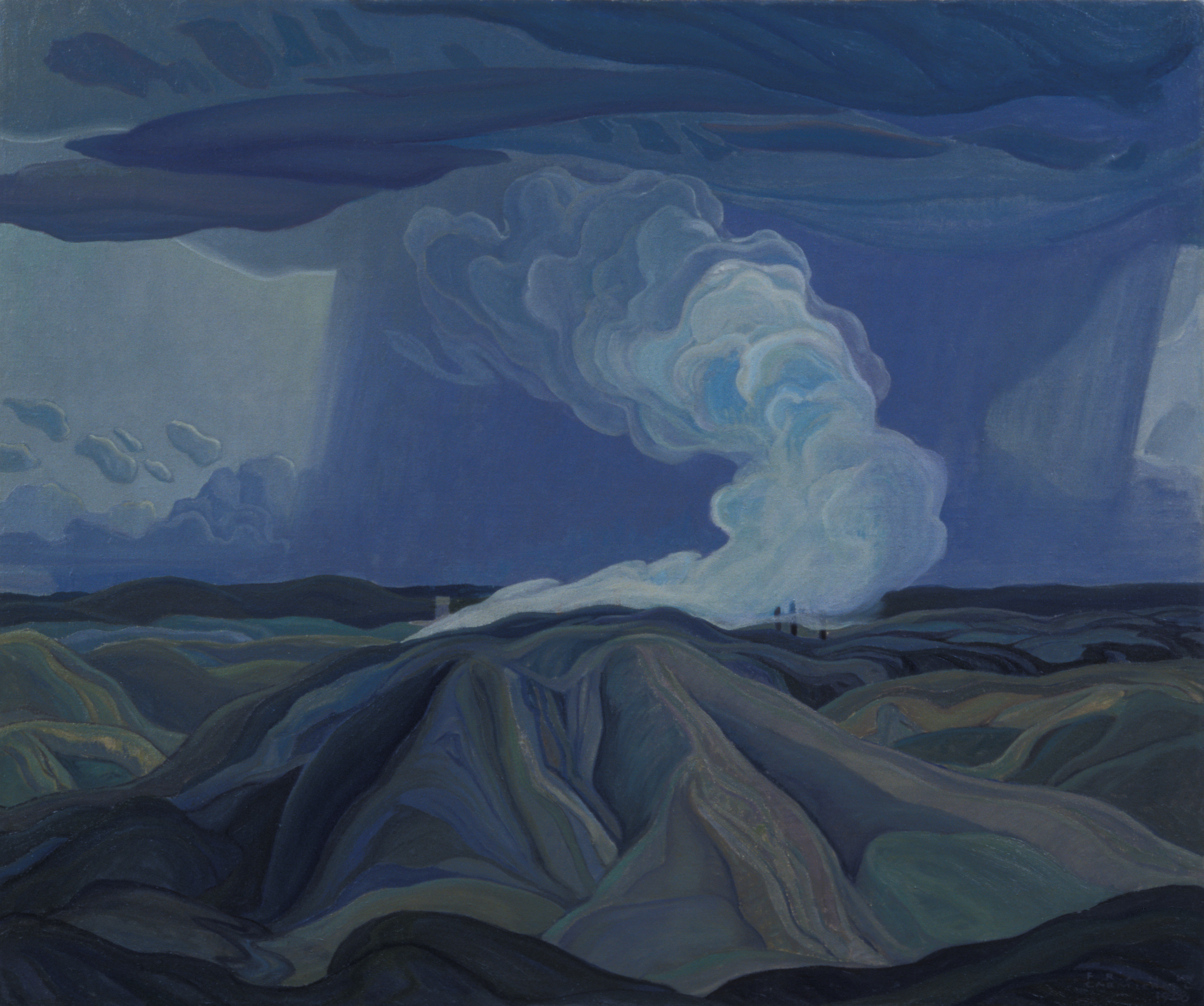
The Nickel Belt, 1928, Firestone Collection of Canadian Art, Ottawa Art Gallery, Ottawa

By the 1930s, Carmichael's work explored themes of industry in northern Ontario, particularly the mining regions. His first depiction of an industrial building is Old Lime Kilns, Rockwood, a sketch made on a 1927 trip with Casson to Rockwood, Ontario.

The 1928 canvas, The Nickel Belt, depicts smoke billowing away into the clouds and a barren rocky foreground. The work juxtaposes bare nature with the ugly environmental effects caused by industry, depicting the wilderness present in his earlier canvases, but also "the billowing extrusion of smoke waste". Art historian Rosemary Donegan writes of the work, "The dramatic beauty of the burnt blue-green rolling hills, seen from a bird's-eye perspective, is subverted by the distant smoke plumes and smelter stacks, which raise questions about the effect of ore smelting on the local landscape." Donegan further compares the work to A.Y. Jackson's 1932 depiction of the Falconbridge smelter near Sudbury, Smoke Fantasy, though she found Carmichael better imbued his painting with power and meaning than Jackson did his. Jackson took his government lobbying efforts further however, pleading in a letter to the minister of Lands and Forests William Finlayson to preserve what became Killarney Provincial Park and Trout Lake. The latter was renamed O.S.A. Lake in honour of the Ontario Society of Artists.

The 1930 canvas A Northern Silver Mine is a composite of several sketches and watercolours following an August 1930 trip to the mining town of Cobalt, Ontario. This painting depicts the relationship of industrial town and nature, where "[t]he houses and mines seem scattered and fragile against the agitated convolutions of the hills." The mine in the foreground and polluted river "[illustrate] the bleakness of the land around the smelters and mines during the 1930s."

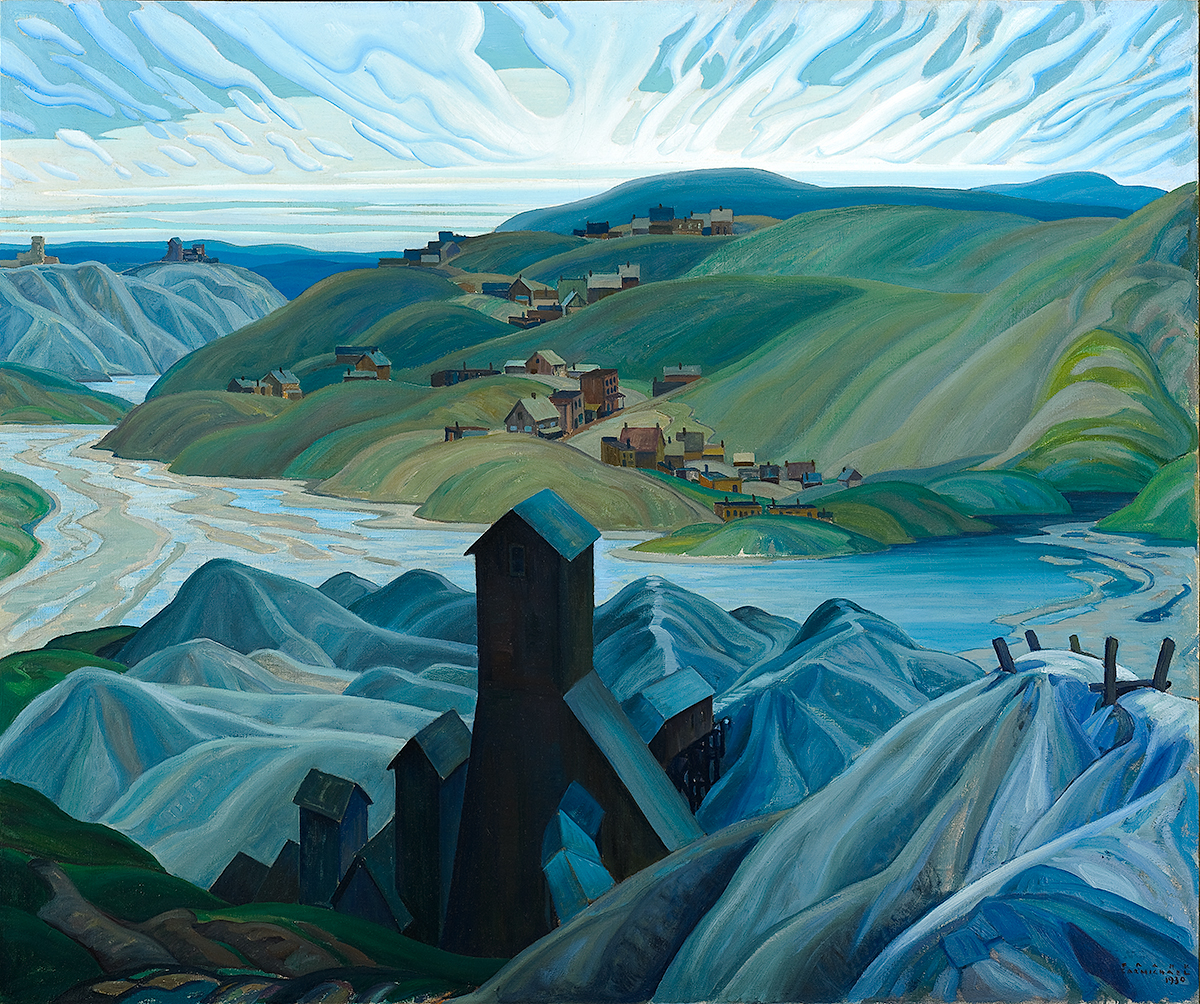
A Northern Silver Mine, 1930, McMichael Canadian Art Collection, Kleinburg

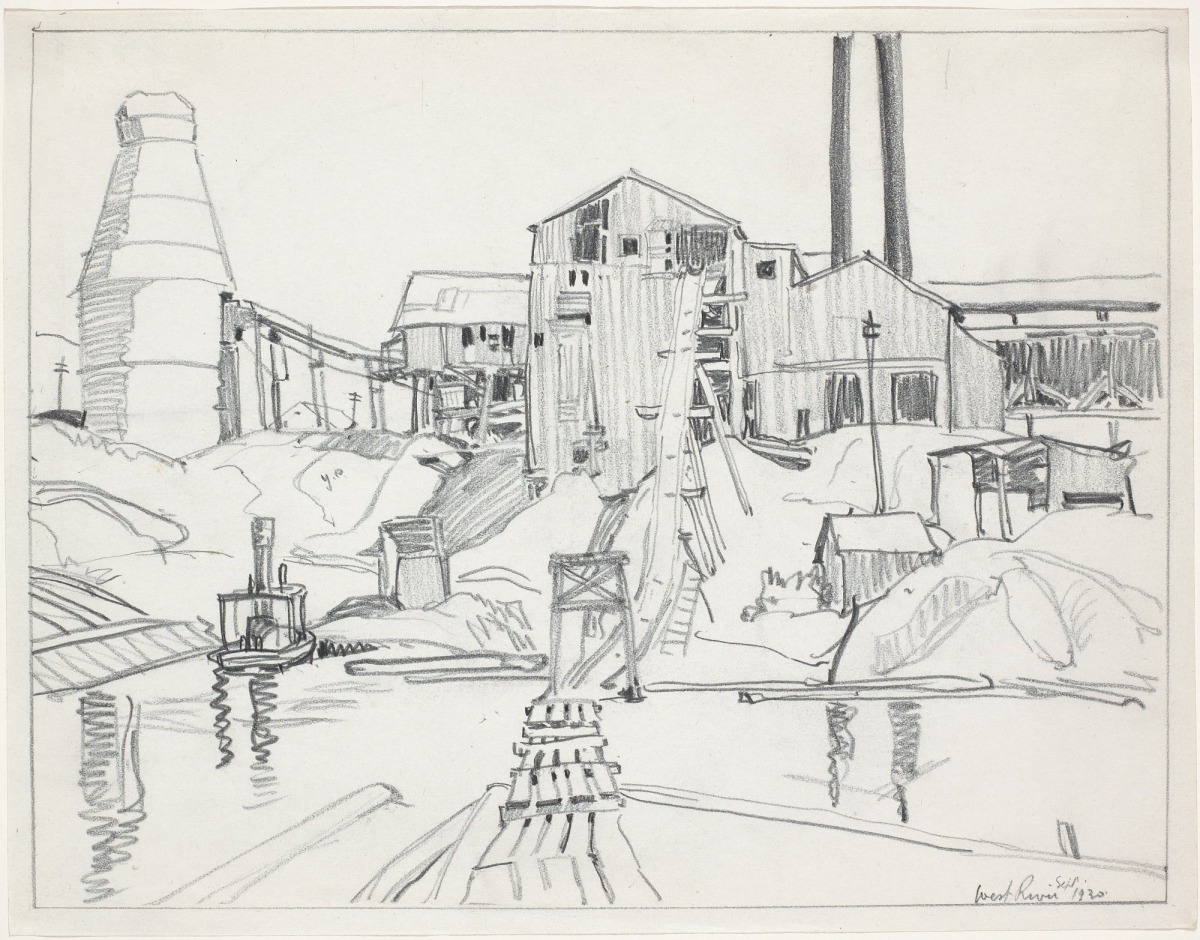
West River, 1930, National Gallery of Canada, Ottawa

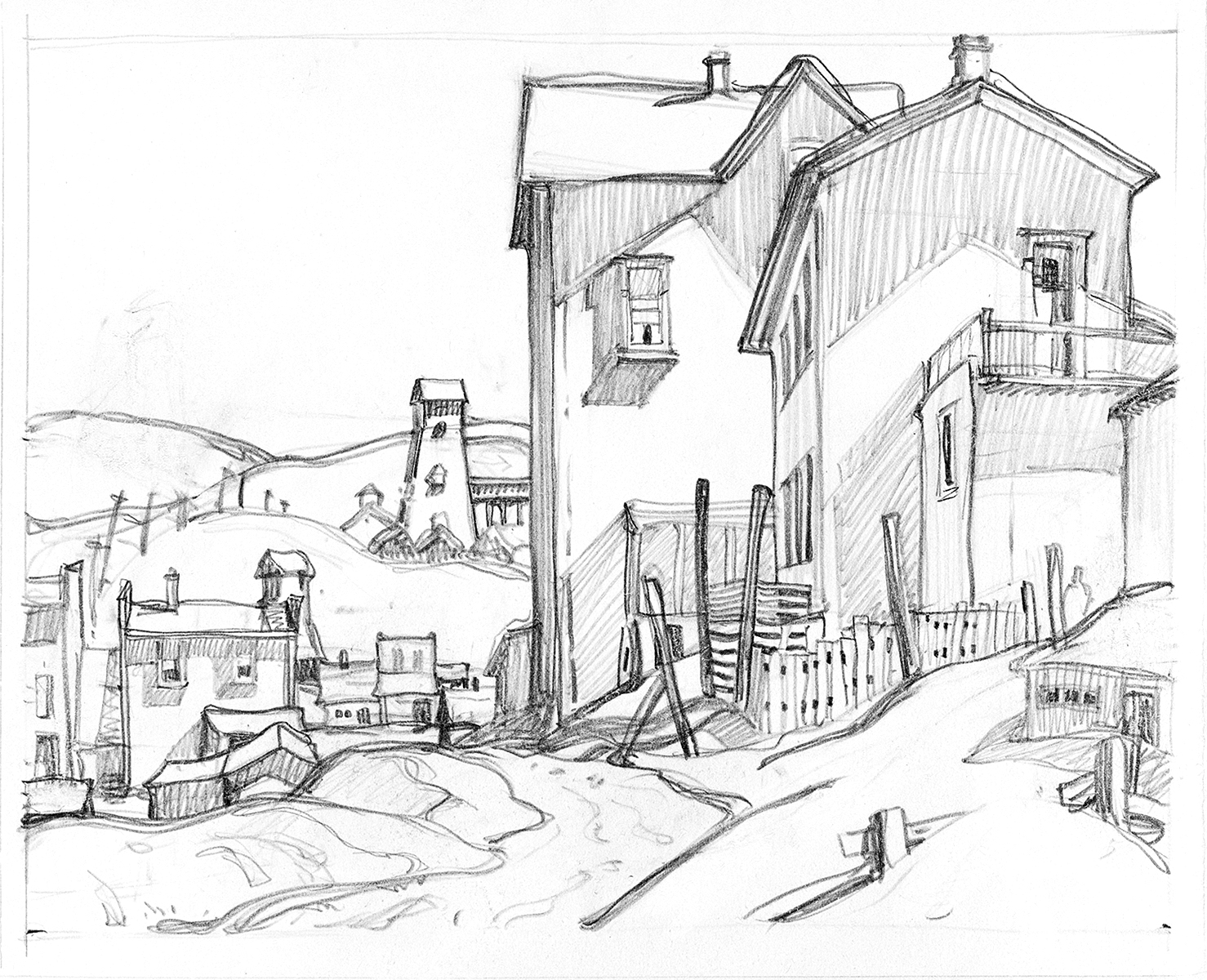
Untitled, 1930, McMichael Canadian Art Collection, Kleinburg

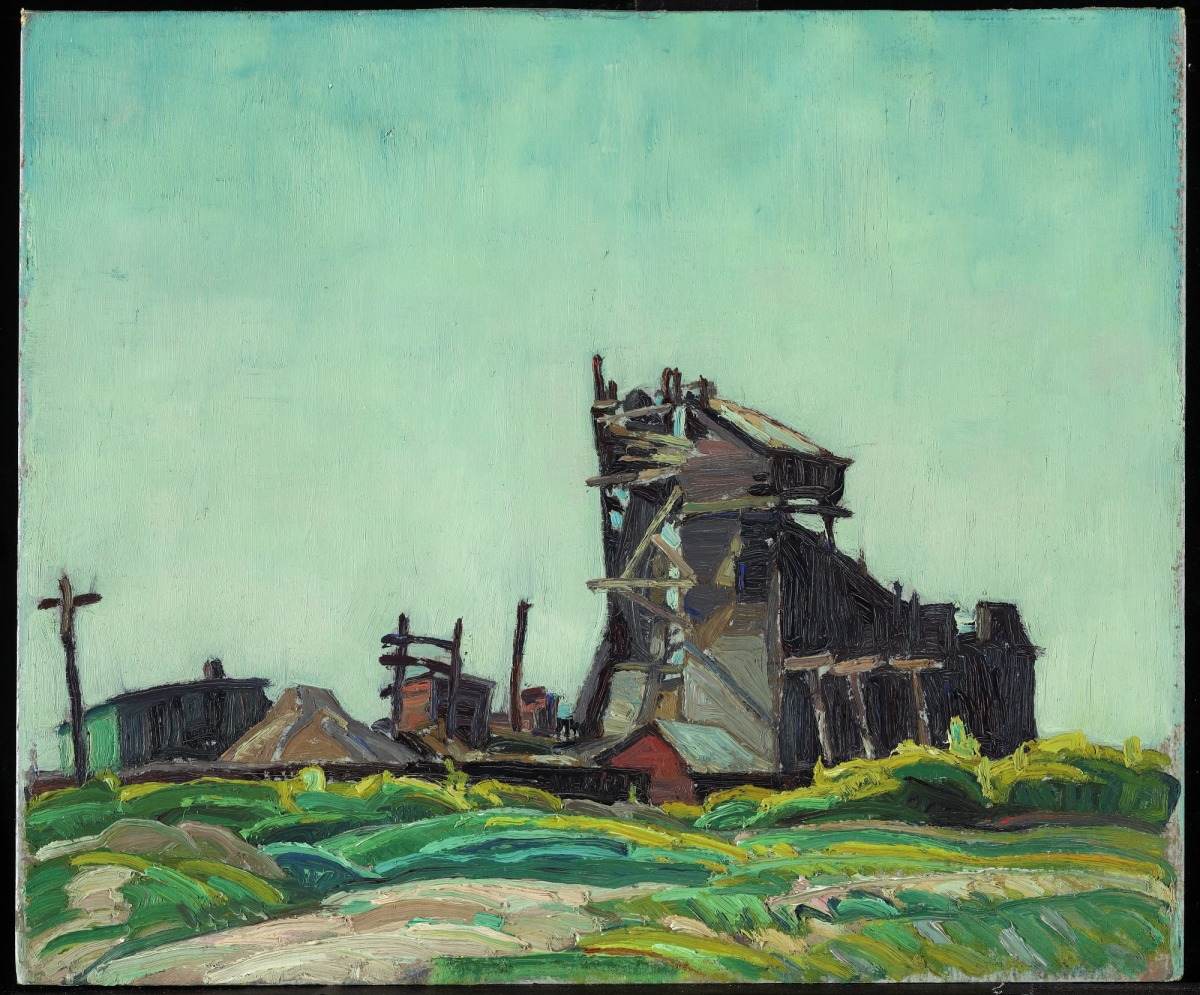
Untitled (Industrial Building), 1934–37, National Gallery of Canada, Ottawa

=== Design, printmaking and illustration ===
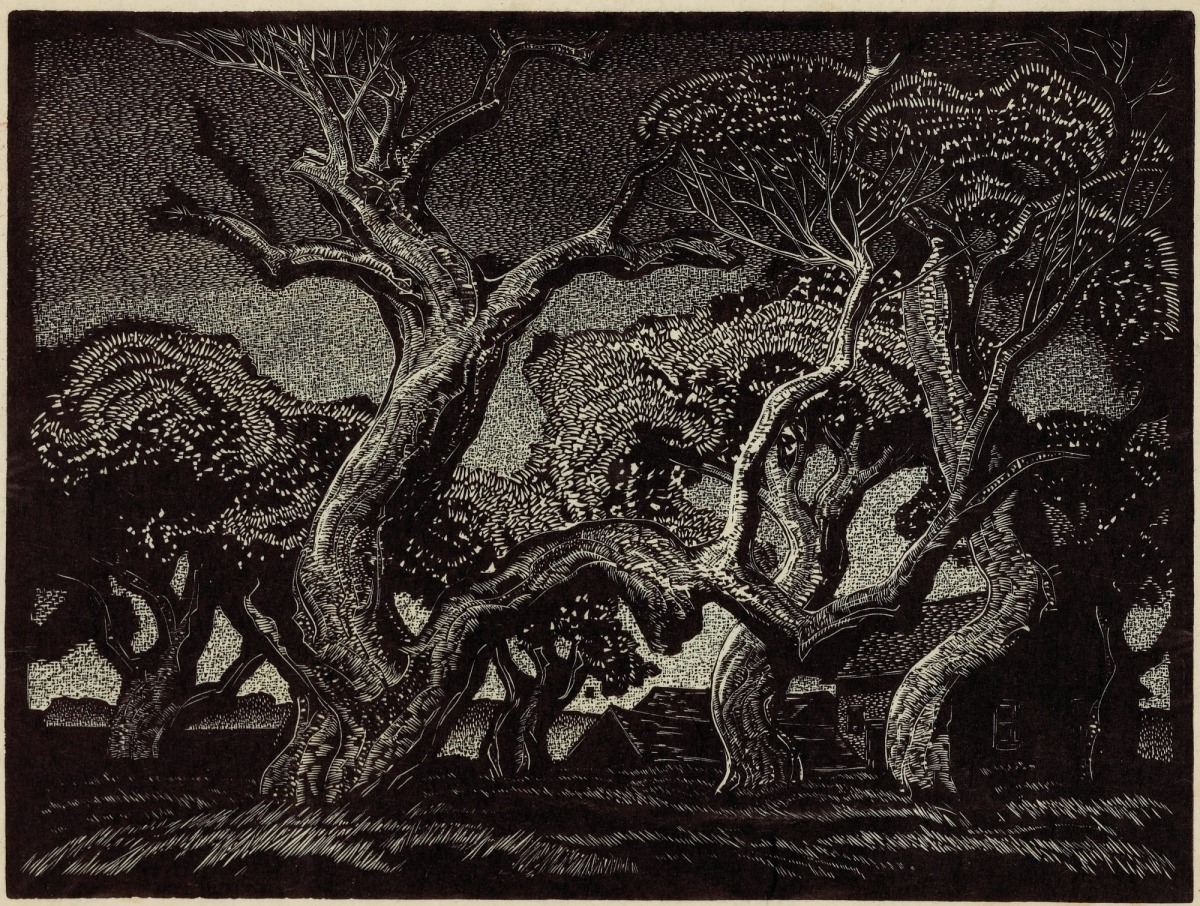
Old Orchard, c. 1940, wood engraving on laid paper, National Gallery of Canada, Ottawa

Like the other members of the Group, Carmichael drew constantly in pencil and ink. He also produced many etchings, linocuts and wood engravings over his lifetime, and was an expert at woodblock and linoleum prints, having become familiar with printing methods from his work in commercial art. In commercial art, the other members of the Group of Seven typically restricted themselves to illustration work; Carmichael, however, took an active role in book design. In one case, he produced the wood engravings, selected the paper, directed the typography and did the complete design for Grace Campbell's 1942 book, Thorn-Apple Tree. (Note: Carmichael completed 15 original woodcuts for the book. For more regarding Campbell's novel, refer to New (2002), p. 173) He worked on book illustrations for Canadian publishers from 1942 until the end of his life.

While working at Sampson-Matthews in the 1920s, his other illustration work saw him designing promotional brochures as well as advertisements for newspapers and magazines. As was typical for the time, his design style was flat and simplified. He also produced illustrations for magazines, including the cover of a 1928 issue of Maclean's magazine.

In Carmichael's early design career, he found the need to avoid meaningless ornamentation, writing

These different things – repose, dignity, movement, energy, grace, rhythm – are part of our very life and make-up. They represent the pattern of our material life and they are the material/structure on which we build designs.

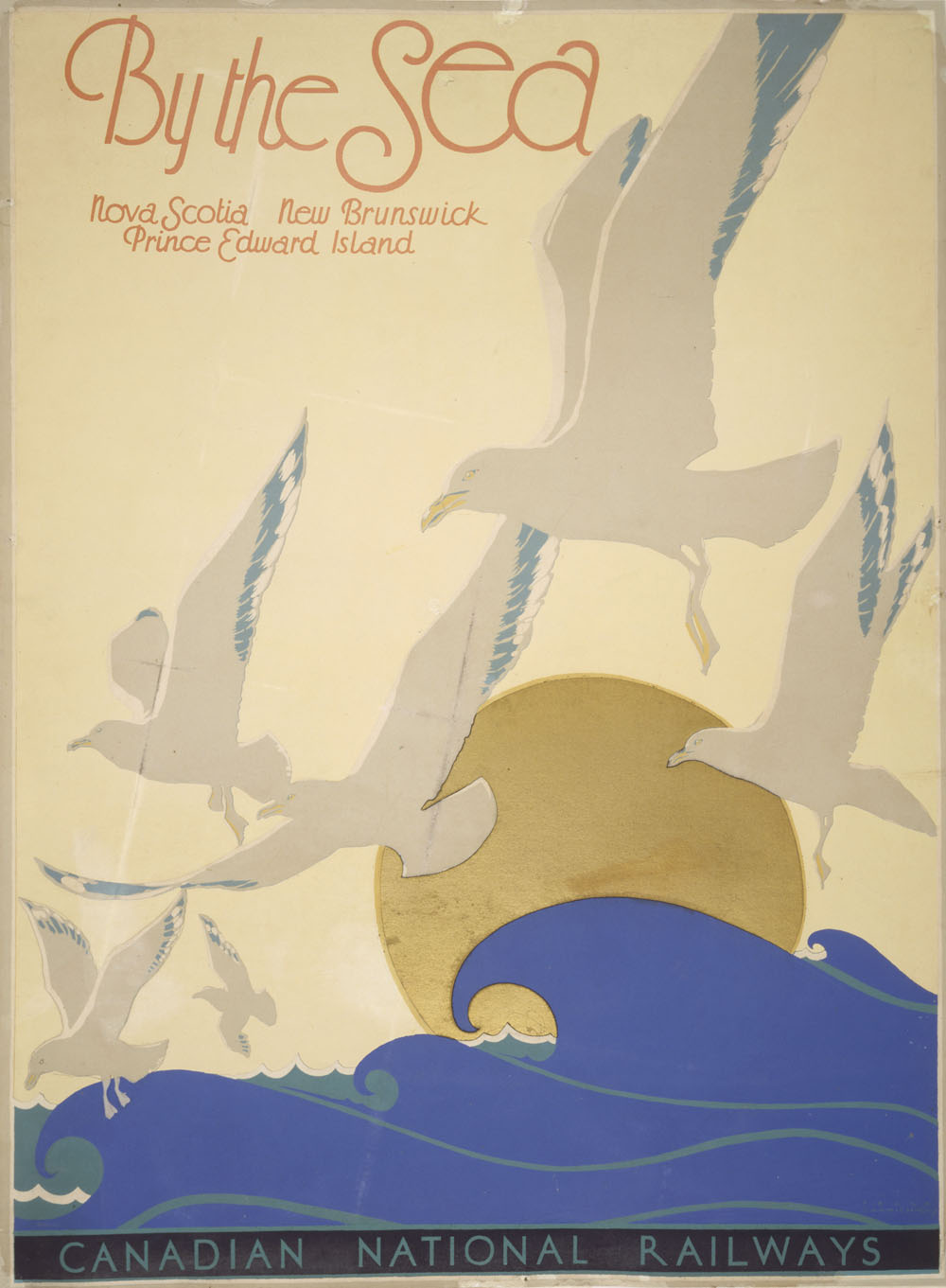
Advertisement, By the sea, Nova Scotia, New Brunswick, Prince Edward Island, 1925, Library and Archives Canada, Ottawa

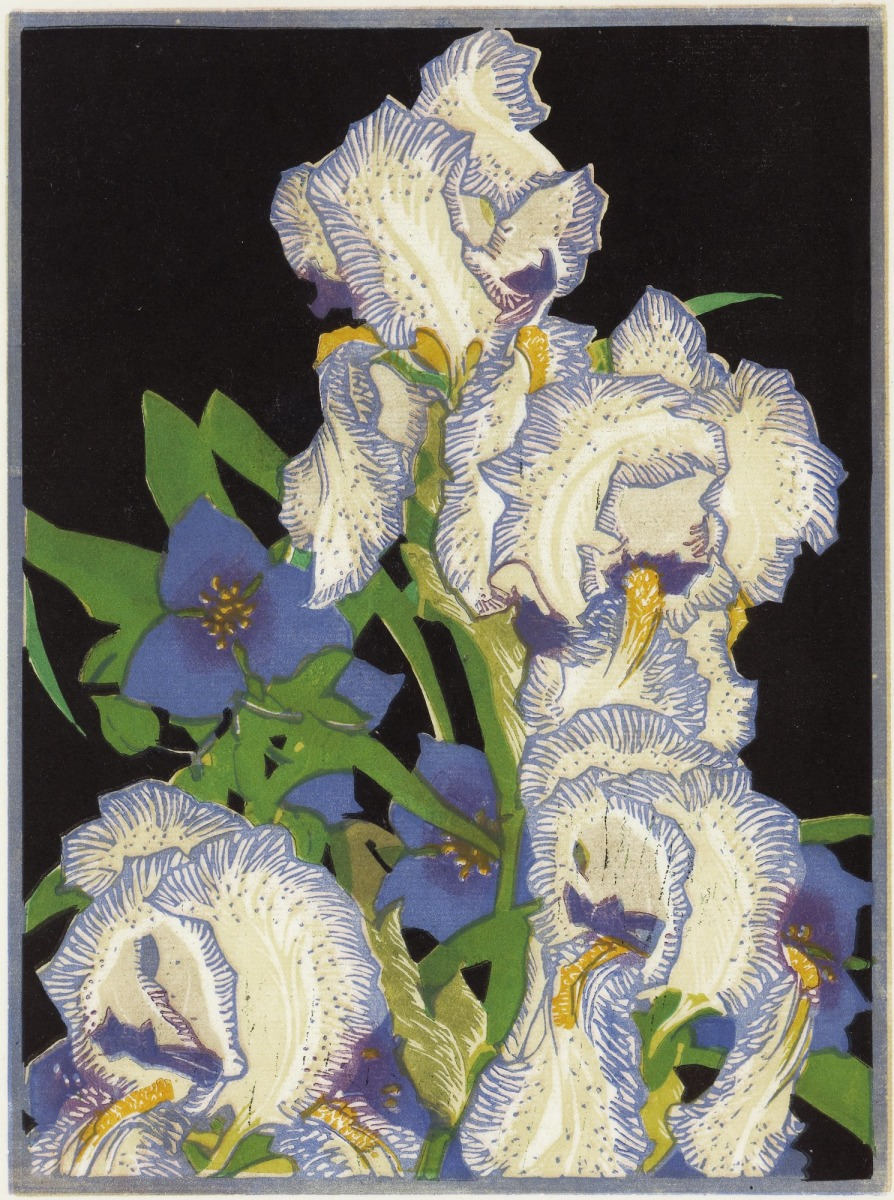
Pencilled Irises, c. 1925–1932, colour linocut on laid paper, National Gallery of Canada, Ottawa

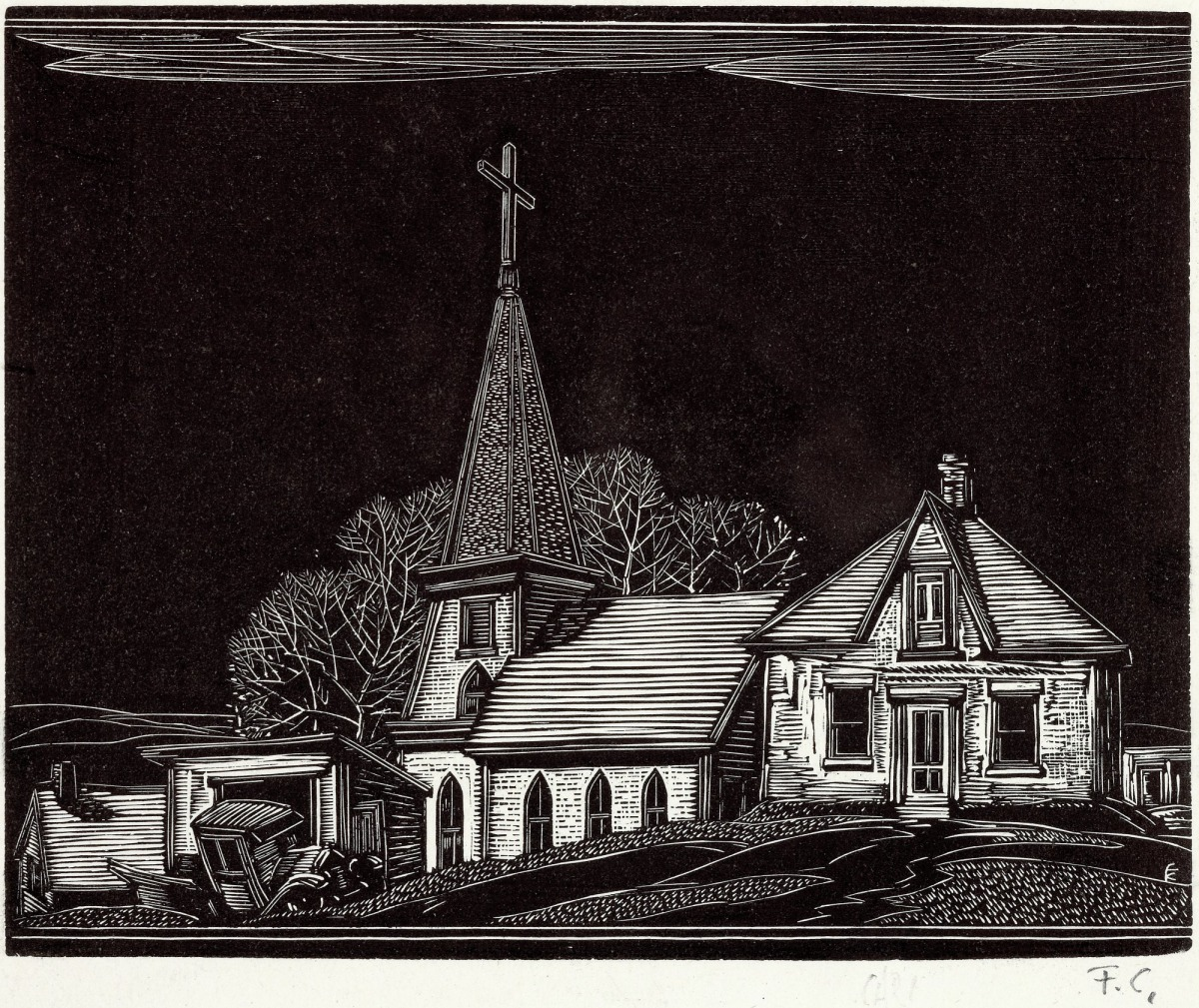
Church, Burks Falls (second version), c. 1930, wood engraving on calendered wove paper, National Gallery of Canada, Ottawa

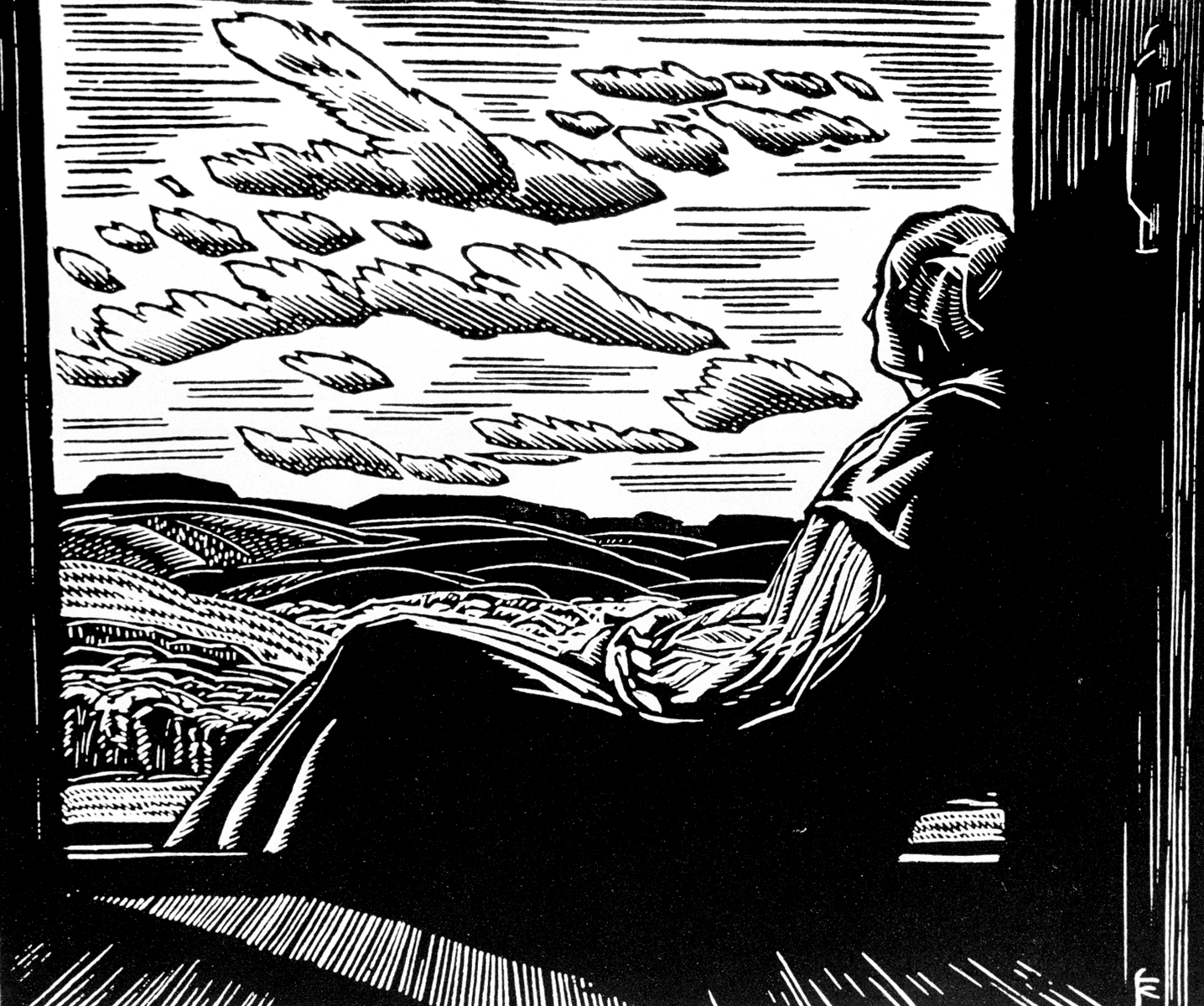
Untitled, 1944, wood engraving on paper, McMichael Canadian Art Collection, Kleinburg

== Legacy ==
Contemporary Emily Carr wrote that Carmichael's work was, "A little pretty and too soft, but pleasant."

Carmichael was a member of the Royal Canadian Academy of Arts (RCA) and awarded the RCA Medal in 1969. In 1952, Dr. Ann Curtin and Carmichael's widow founded the Franklin Carmichael Art Group, located at 34 Riverdale Drive in Toronto.

In 1990, Carmichael's granddaughter, Catharine Mastin, and curator Megan Bice held an exhibition of Carmichael's work at the McMichael Canadian Art Collection. In a review of the exhibition, Joan Murray was disappointed in the organizers focus on Carmichael's oil works, which she saw as "overworked and overfinished", rather than his "sublime" watercolours. Catharine Mastin has since been a curator at the Glenbow Museum in Calgary and directed the Art Gallery of Windsor and written about her grandfather's art.

== Record sale prices ==
The 1929 watercolour Lone Lake was considered to be the highlight of a major sale of Canadian art in May 2012 at Joyner Waddington's spring art auction in Toronto, Ontario, selling for CAD$330,400. The subject of the painting is a small lake called Carmichael Lake in the La Cloche Mountains of Killarney Provincial Park near Sudbury, Ontario.

== Selected paintings ==
Paintings by Franklin Carmichael

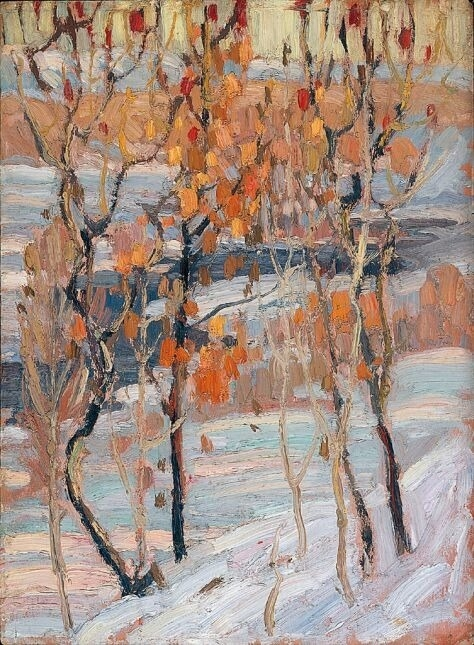
Study for Sumacs, oil on wood, 1915, National Gallery of Canada, Ottawa

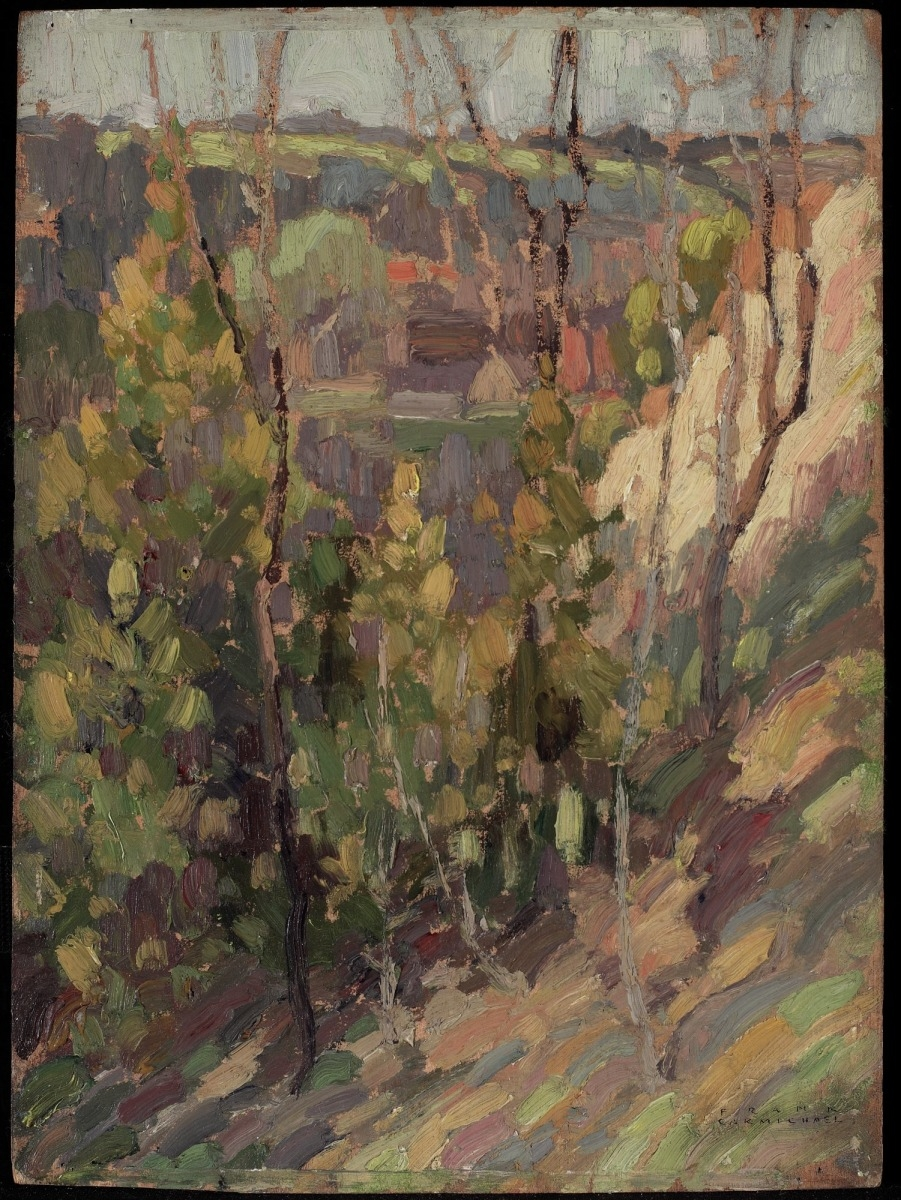
Hillside, oil on wood, 1917–20, National Gallery of Canada, Ottawa

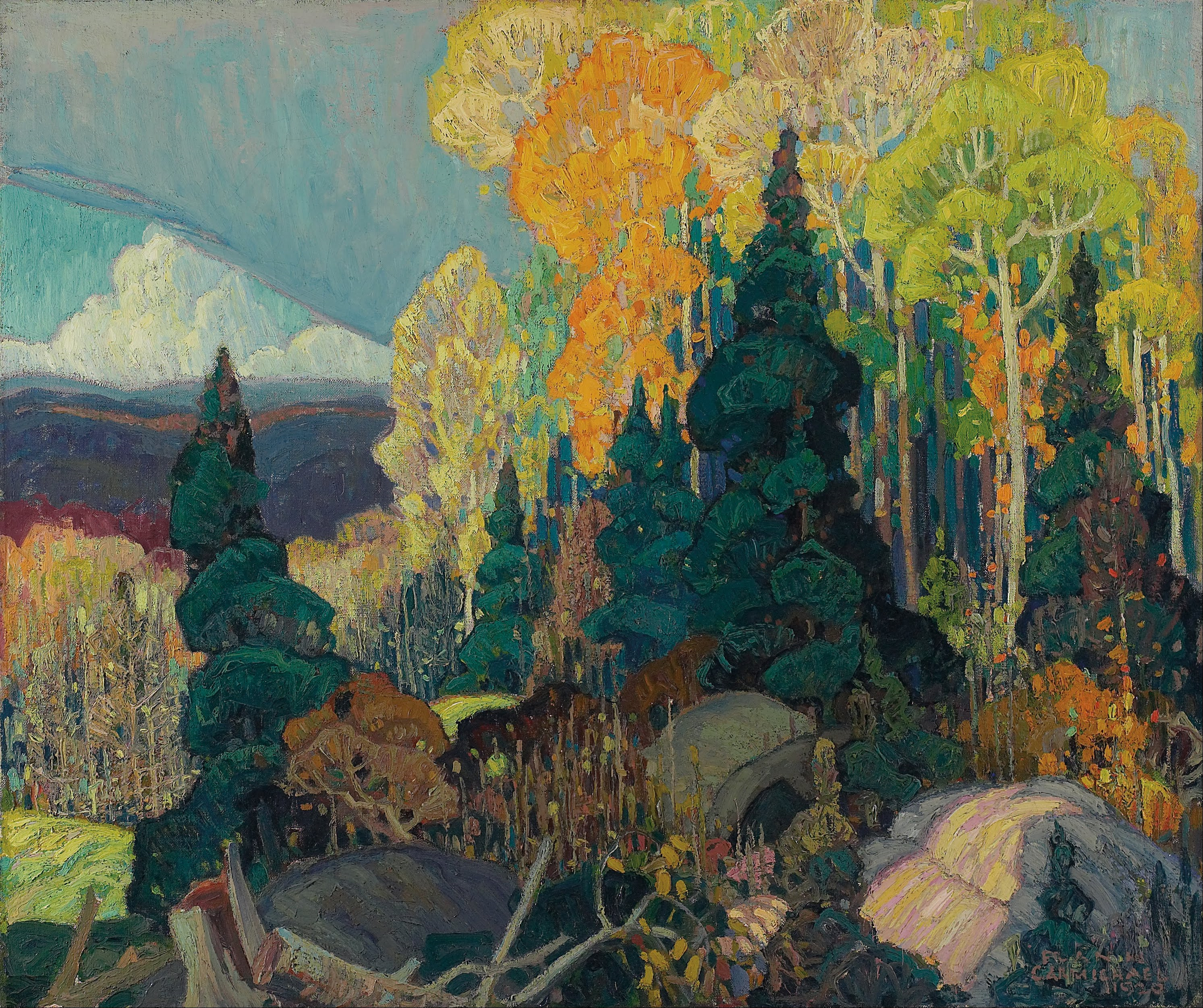
Autumn Hillside, oil on canvas, 1920, Art Gallery of Ontario, Toronto

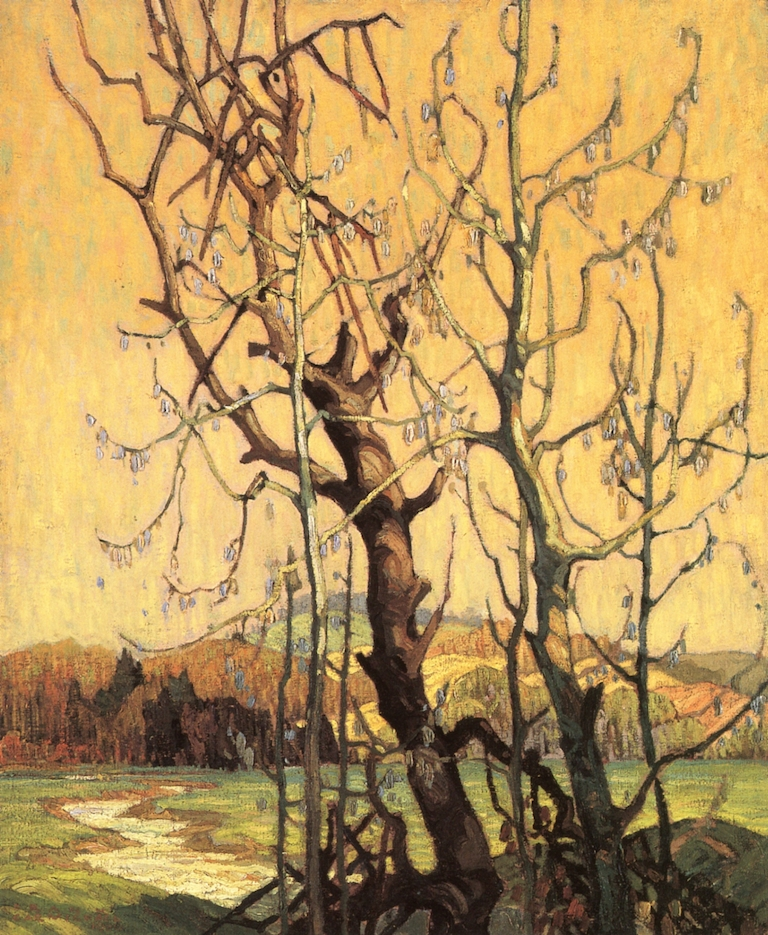
Spring, oil on canvas, 1920, private collection

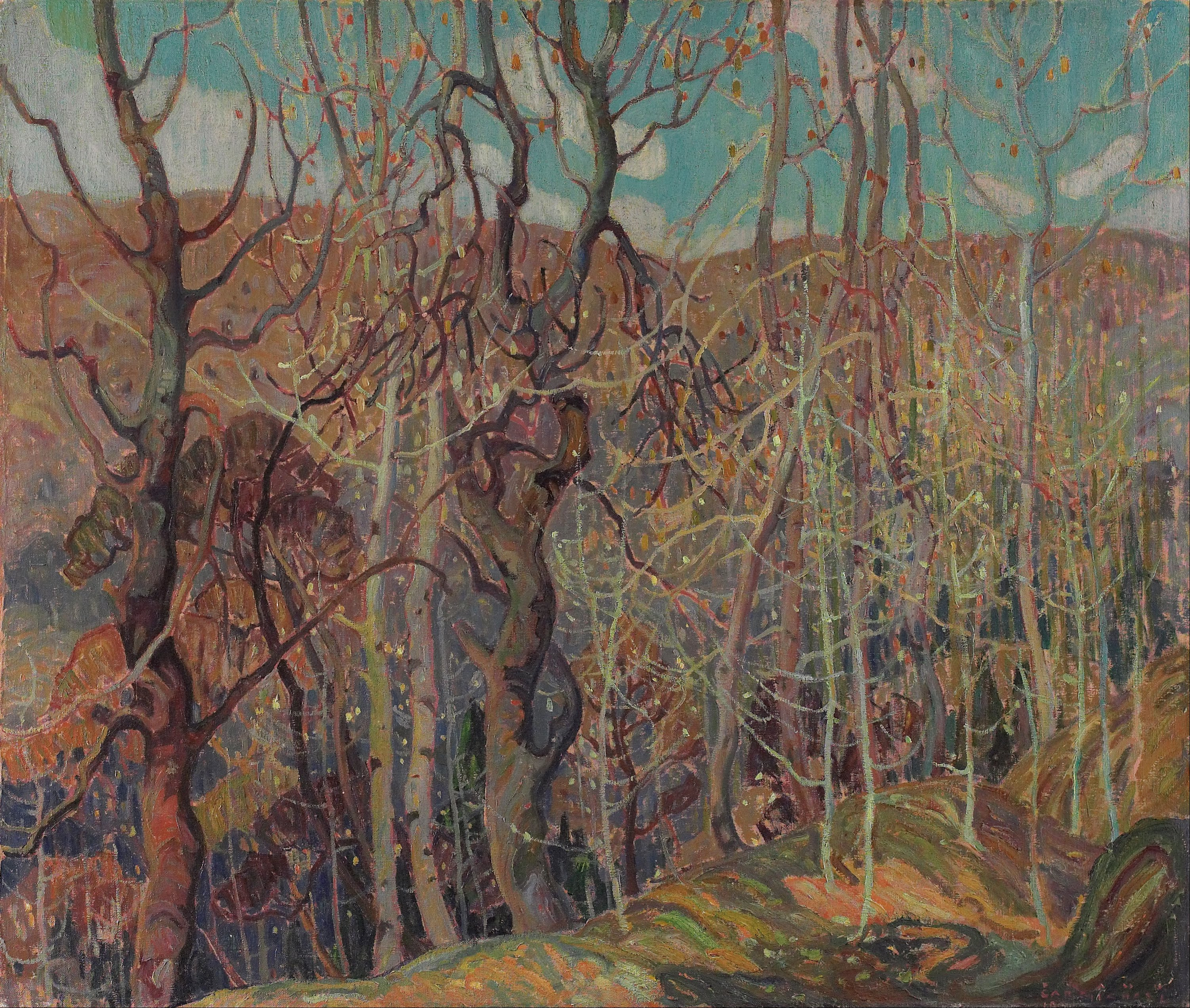
Silvery Tangle, oil on canvas, 1921, Art Gallery of Ontario, Toronto

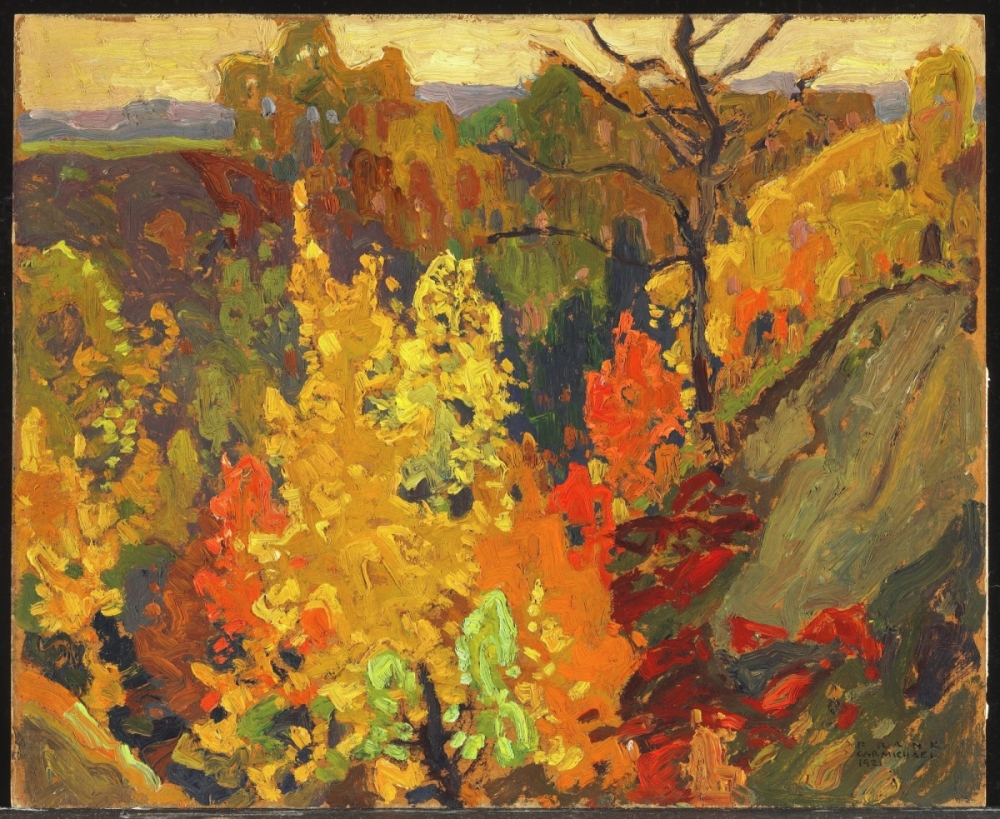
Autumn, oil on paperboard, 1921, National Gallery of Canada, Ottawa

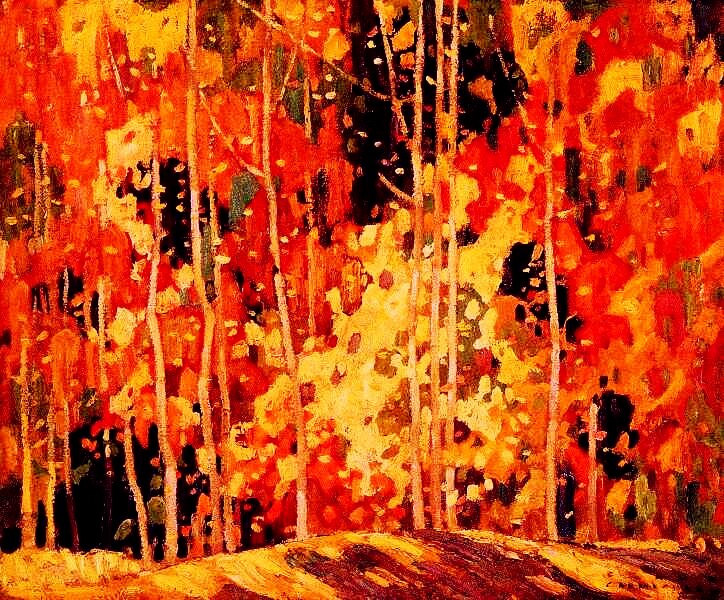
The Glade, oil on canvas, 1922, unknown

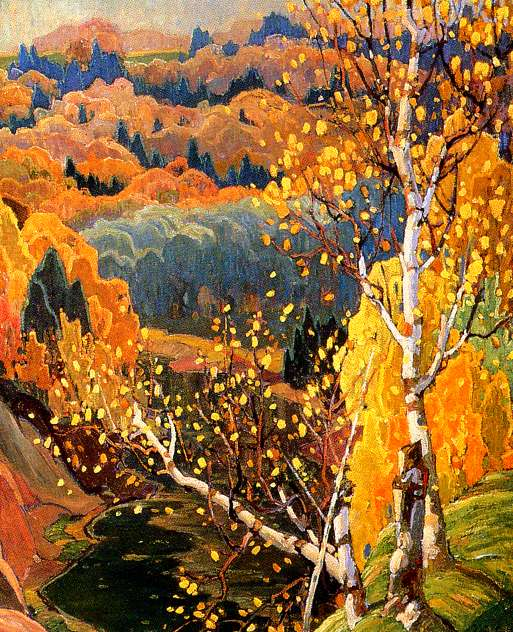
October Gold, oil on canvas, 1922, National Gallery of Canada, Ottawa

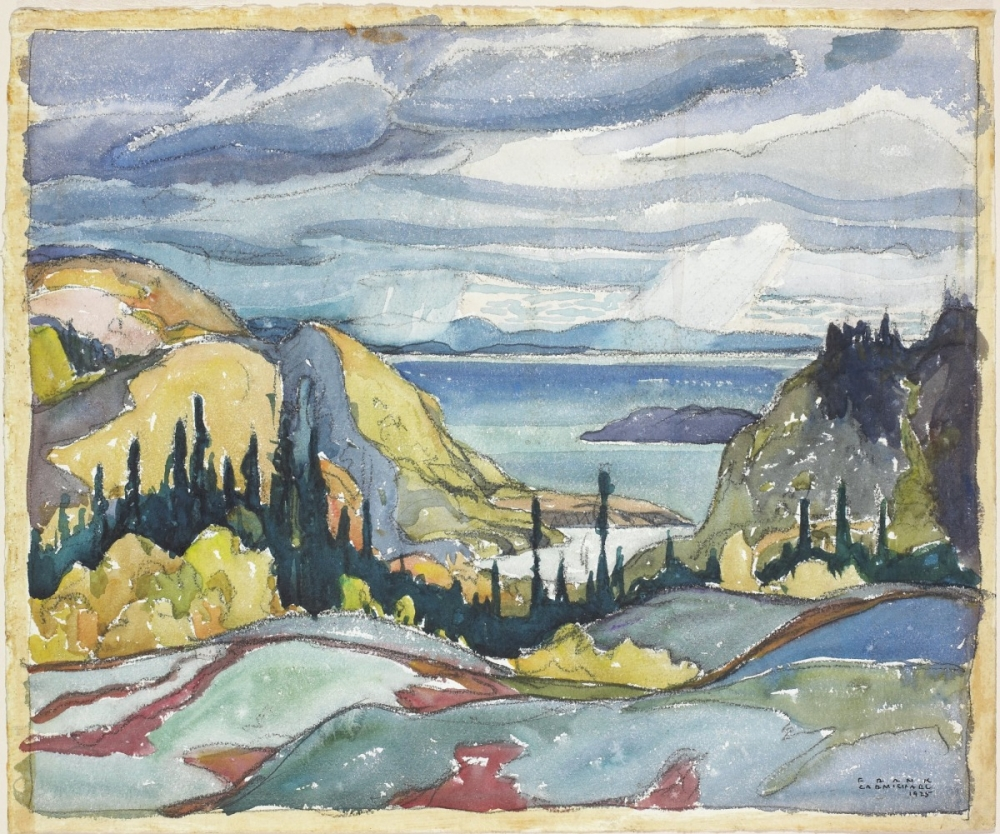
Untitled (Pines, Lake Superior), 1925, National Gallery of Canada, Ottawa

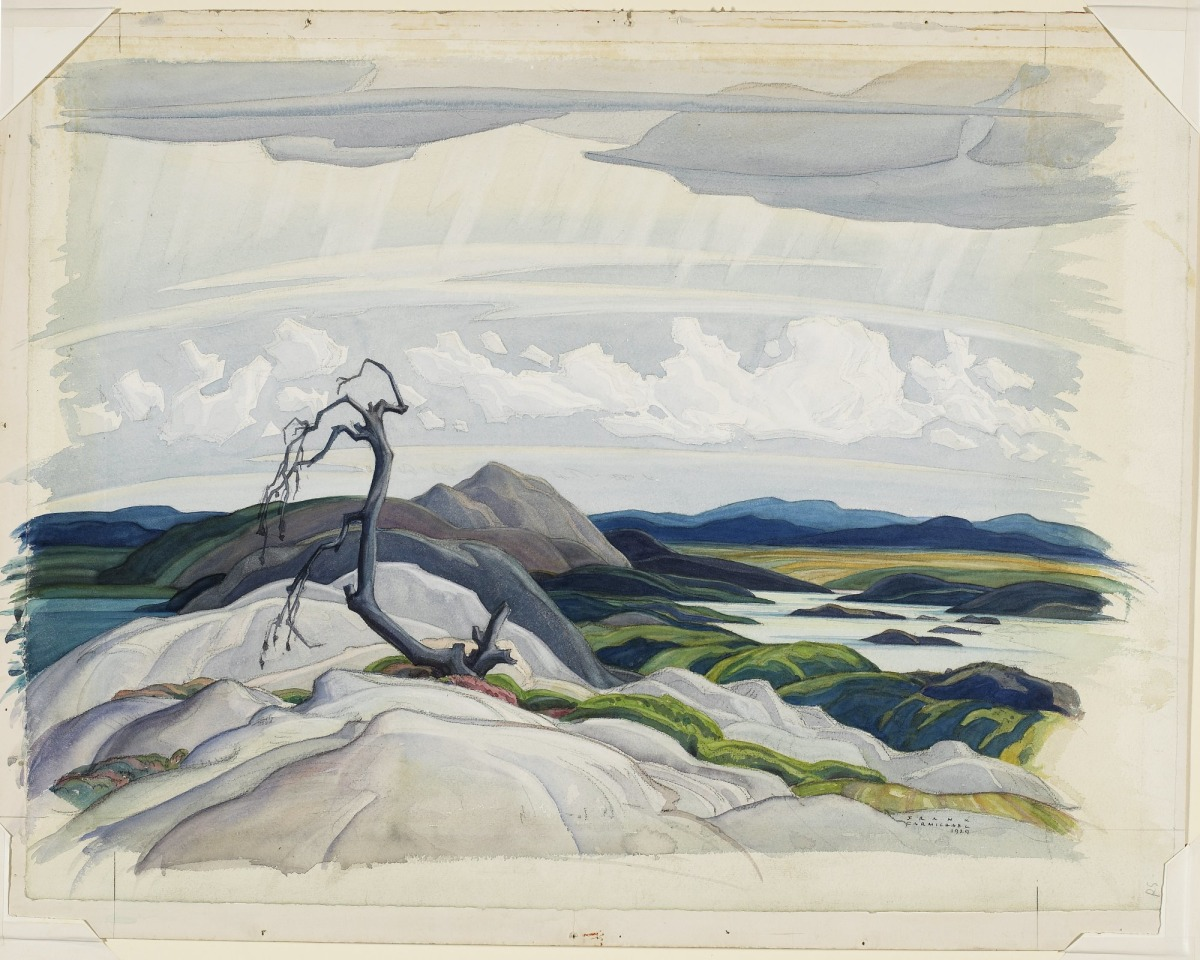
The Whitefish Hills, watercolour over graphite on wove paper, 1929, National Gallery of Canada, Ottawa

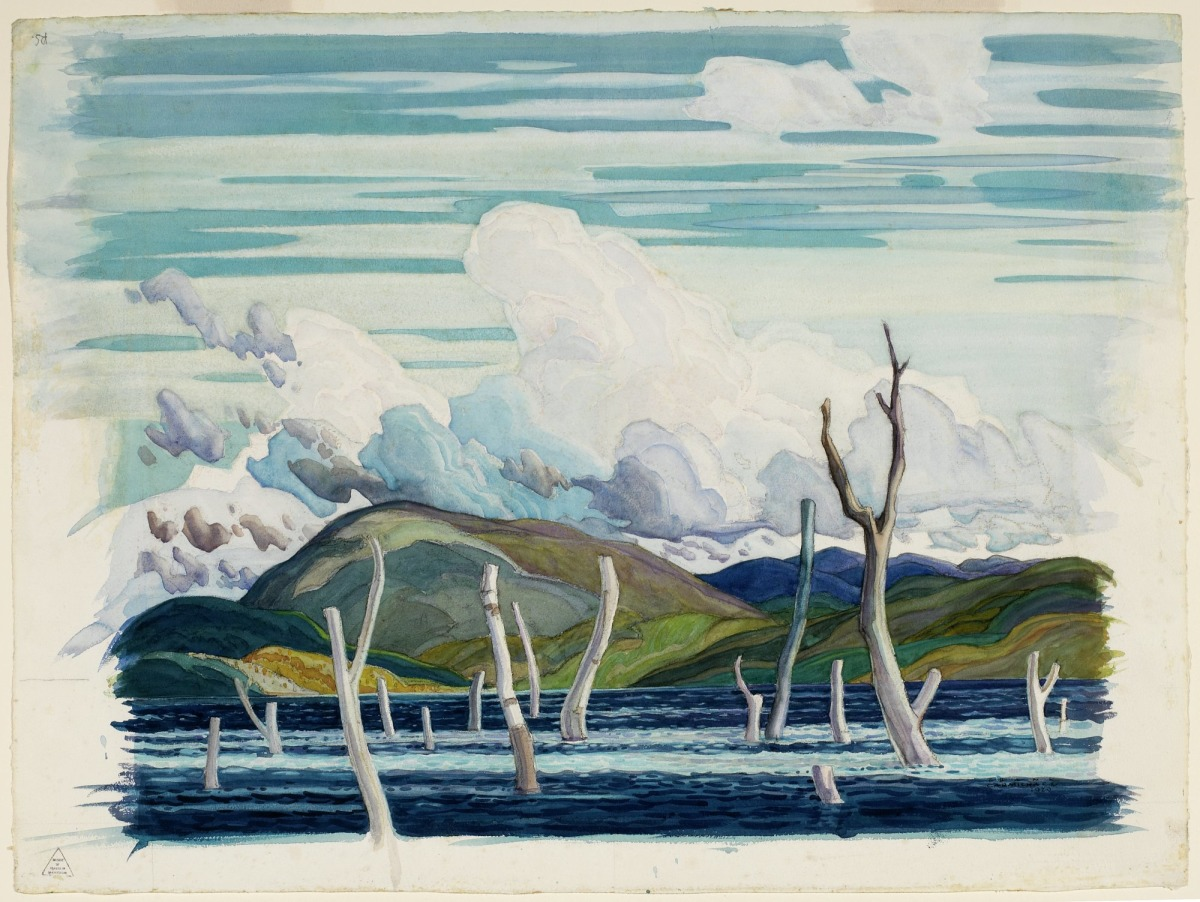
Wabajisik Drowned Land, watercolour and gouache over charcoal on wove paper, 1929, National Gallery of Canada, Ottawa

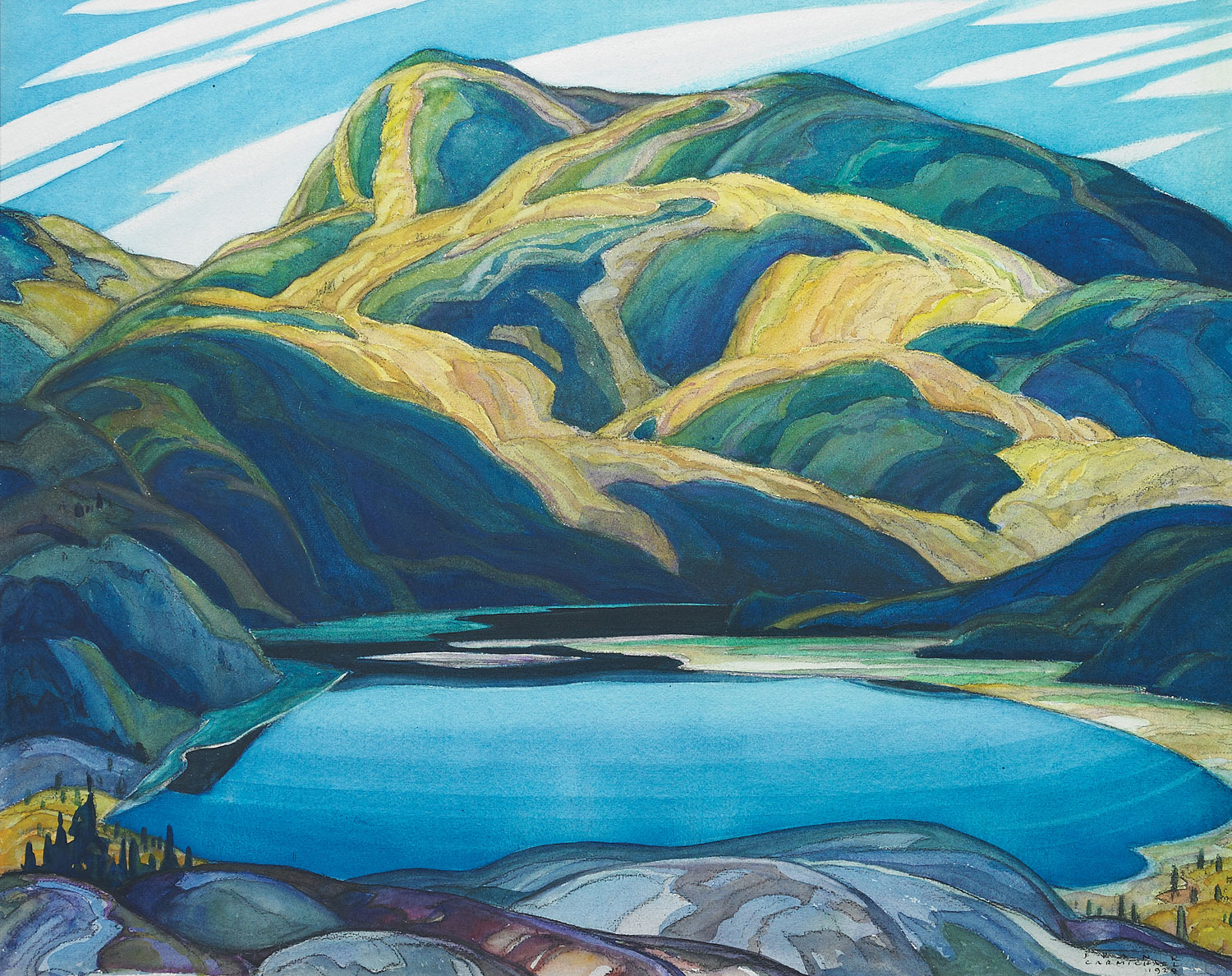
Lone Lake, watercolor, 1929, private collection

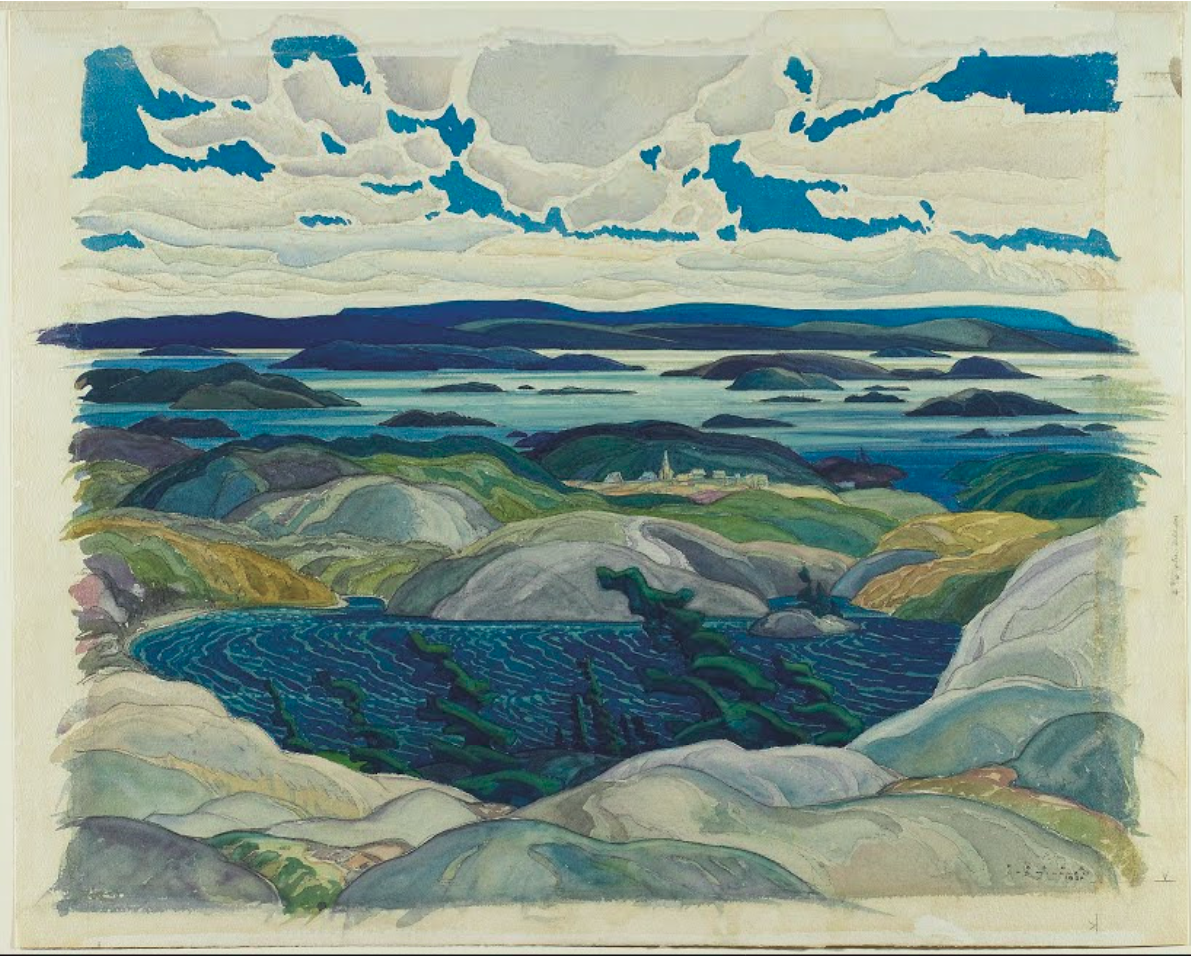
Bay of Islands, watercolour on paper, 1930, Art Gallery of Ontario, Toronto

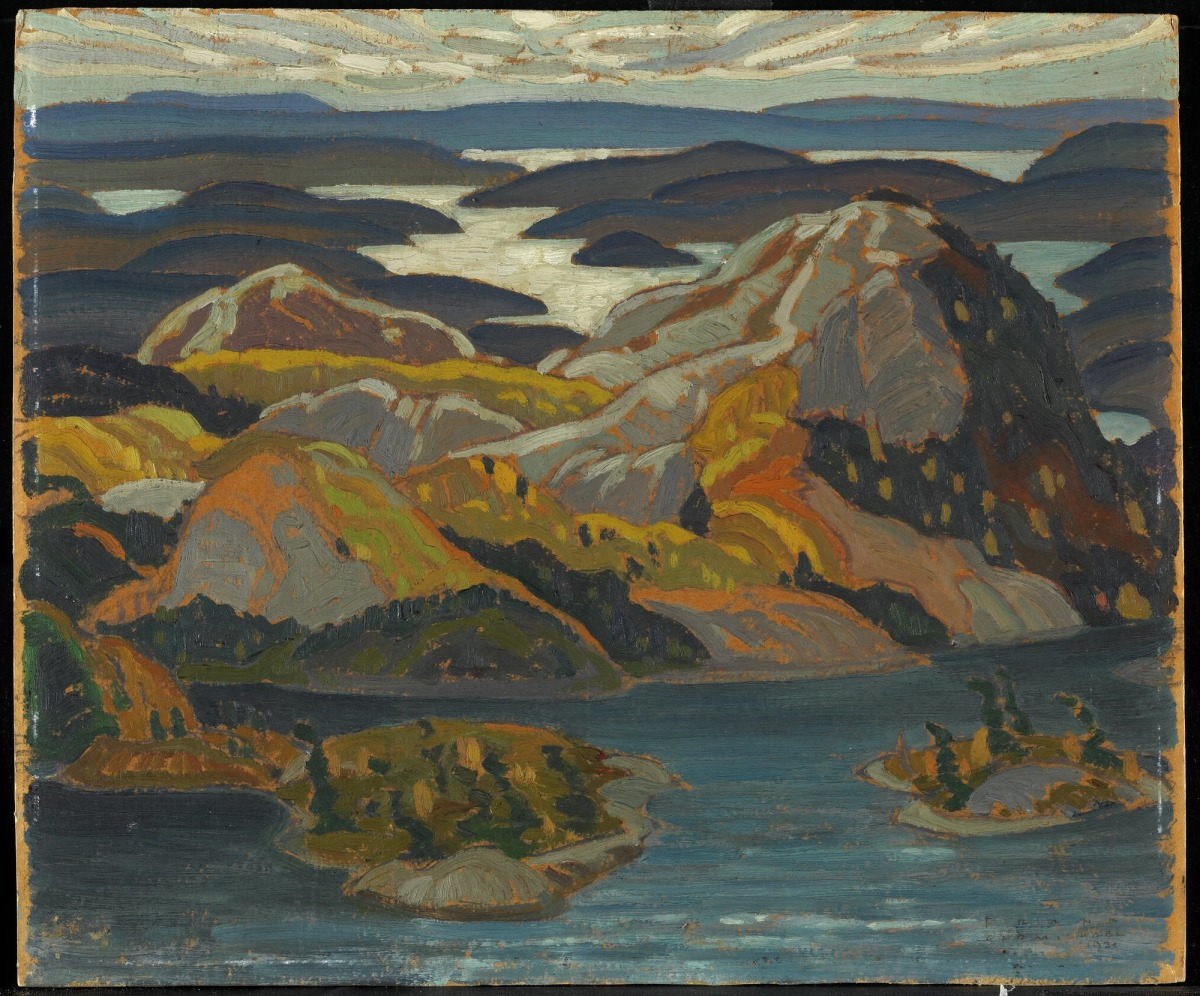
Grace Lake, oil on paperboard, 1931, National Gallery of Canada, Ottawa

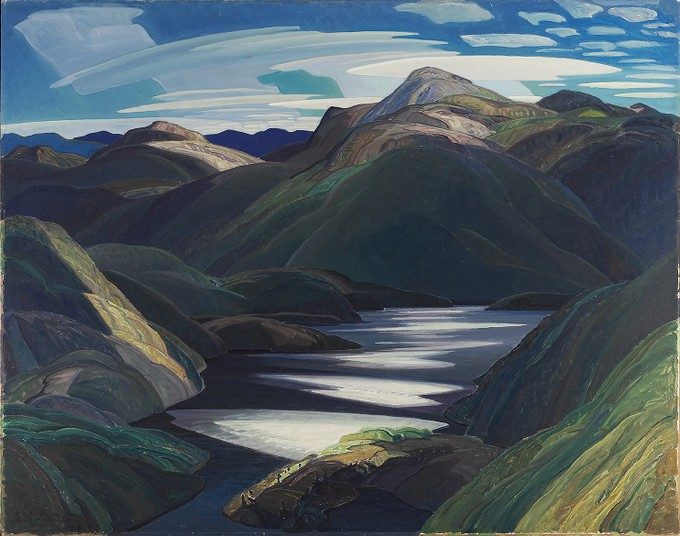
Light and Shadow, oil on hardboard, 1937, Art Gallery of Ontario, Toronto

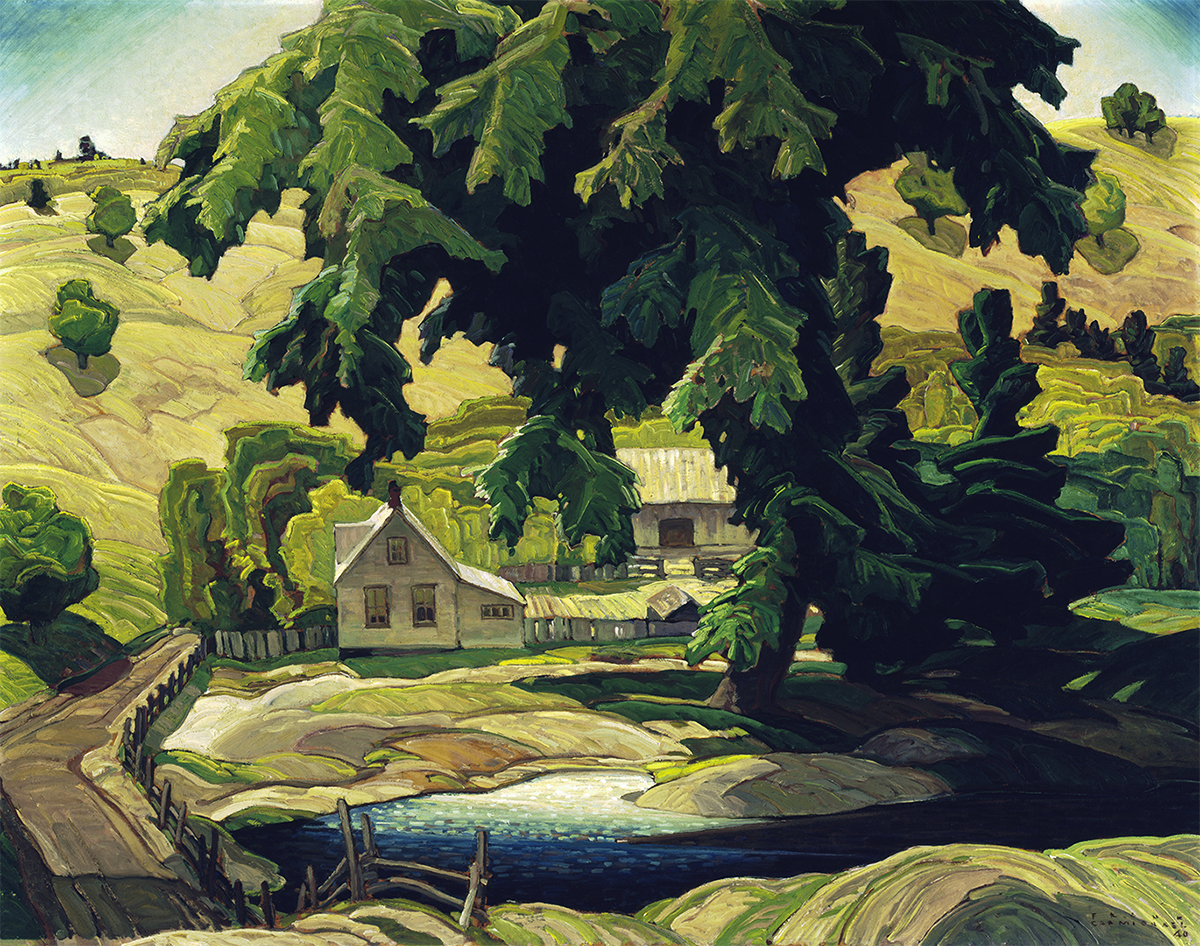
Farm, Haliburton, oil on hardboard, 1940, McMichael Canadian Art Collection, Kleinburg
