= Catharine Mastin =

Canadian curator (born 1963)

- Born: Catharine Margaret Mastin; August 1, 1963 (age 62); Toronto, Ontario, Canada
- Education: York University, Toronto, B.A. (studio and art history), M.A. (Canadian art and architecture); University of Alberta, Edmonton, PhD (2012)
- Occupations: museum director, curator, writer, art historian

Catharine Margaret Mastin (born August 1, 1963) is a Canadian curator. She is a specialist in modern and contemporary art with an emphasis on gender and women's art practices. She has worked at the Art Gallery of Windsor in Ontario and the Glenbow Museum in Calgary, Alberta. At the Art Gallery of Windsor, she was curator, arts administrator and executive director (2010-2020). She is an Adjunct Member of the Faculty of Graduate Studies in Art History at York University. Mastin also curated the exhibition "Franklin Carmichael: Portrait of a Spiritualist", an exhibition organized by the National Gallery of Canada, Ottawa which toured Canada between 1999 and 2001.

== Early life and education ==
Mastin grew up in Toronto and went to York University for both her Bachelor of Fine Arts and her master's degree in art history and architecture. In 2012, the University of Alberta awarded her a PhD in women’s history with the dissertation Beyond ‘the Artist's Wife’: Women in Artist-Couple Marriage and the Exhibition Experience in Postwar Canada. Her doctoral writing was included in Mary Pratt (2013, 2nd edition 2016).

Mastin's grandfather is the artist Franklin Carmichael.

== Career ==
In her over 30-year curatorial career, Mastin has curated more than one hundred exhibitions. She was hired in 1988 as curator of Canadian Art at the Art Gallery of Windsor. In 1992, organized an exhibition and participated in the writing of the multi-author book, ‘The Talented Intruder’: Wyndham Lewis in Canada, 1939-1945, which was praised by English reviewers as making progress in understanding Lewis's Canadian years.

From 1995 until 2006, needing a broader field of vision, she worked at the Glenbow Museum, Calgary as senior art curator and twice interim vice-president (exhibitions and collections). In 1996, she co-founded the Alberta Biennial of Contemporary Art which she co-curated in 1996 and 1998. She also curated exhibitions of Franklin Carmichael, including one for the National Gallery of Canada, Ottawa, (2001) which toured Canada through 2003, and the Art Gallery of Sudbury (2005). In 2002, she curated the major travelling exhibition, The Group of Seven in Western Canada, accompanied by the first comprehensive book on the subject which she edited and for which she wrote the introductory essay.

From 2010 till 2020, Mastin served as the sixth executive director of the Art Gallery of Windsor during which time she led the gallery through a significant organizational change process and its 75th anniversary. Under her leadership, the gallery earned an unprecedented 20 performance awards between 2013 and 2019 for tourism, partnerships, exhibitions, writing, staff excellence, volunteerism and community recognition. She launched the digitization initiative, the on-line collections exhibition publishing program, and oversaw three multi-year permanent collection exhibitions including the Art Gallery of Windsor collection at 75 Years (2018-2021) which strengthened the voices of indigenous artists and women with new acquisitions.

In Windsor, Ontario, her exhibition of photographer Brenda Francis Pelkey: A Retrospective toured Canada (2016-2018), along with the accompanying multi-authored monograph, Territories: Brenda Francis Pelkey (2017). Critics considered both show and book thoughtful and definitive. She also has written numerous articles for catalogues such as ones on Frances Loring and Florence Wyle in Uninvited: Canadian Women Artists in the Modern Movement. In 2022, she wrote Marion Nicoll: Life and Work for the Art Canada Institute, available online. In 2023, she guest-curated Cobalt: A Mining Town and the Canadian Imagination, featuring the work of Canadian modern artists who visited the town between the First and Second World Wars, for the McMichael Canadian Art Collection.

Since 2014 she has served as an advisor for the Gail and Stephen Jarislowsky Institute for Canadian Art as well as serving on the jury for Canada’s national portrait competition, the Kingston Prize in 2017 and in 2019. In 2017, Mastin volunteered for five years of service on the board of directors of the Ontario Association of Art Galleries including a term as president (2017-2018). In 2022, she served as an Adjunct Member in the Faculty of Graduate Studies in Art History at York University, Toronto, Canada. In 2024, as well as curating the exhibition, she wrote the book "Cobalt: A Mining Town and the Canadian Imagination" for the McMichael Canadian Art Collection in Kleinburg.

== Honours and awards ==
In 1993 and 1995 her writing projects on Wyndham Lewis and colonial narratives in public art collections earned her curatorial writing awards from the Ontario Association of Art Galleries. In 1998, she was a two-time nominee for Canada’s Top 40 under 40 Award for outstanding professionals in all sectors. Her book on The Group of Seven in Western Canada was the first multi-authored volume on an important Canadian art movement and the also one of the first volumes on the Group of Seven to include female writers; it remained on the Canadian best-seller list through the summer of 2002 and was released in a second edition in 2007.

== Bibliography ==
- Catharine Mastin. Toronto: Canadian Who`s Who, 2019. 8 January 2020. ISBN 978-1-64265-241-3.
