= Joan Murray (art historian) =

Canadian writer, curator, and art historian

Joan Murray OOnt FRSC
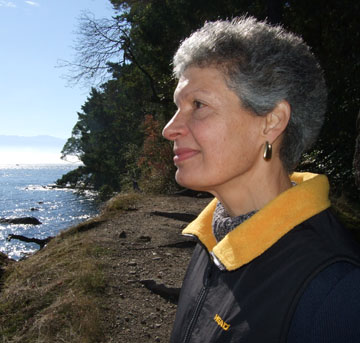
- Born: Joan Arden Charlat Murray; August 12, 1943 (age 83); New York City, United States
- Occupations: Art historian; author; curator
- Known for: Tom Thomson catalogue; museum director; curator; writing

Joan Arden Charlat Murray OOnt FRSC (born August 12, 1943) is an American-born Canadian art historian, writer and curator.

== Education and personal life ==
Joan Charlat was born in New York City in 1943. She moved to Canada in 1959 to marry W. Ross Murray (1930–2020) and studied art history at the University of Toronto, receiving an Honours B.A. (1965). Murray completed an M.A. at Columbia University in 1966.

== Career ==
In 1968 she took a position as the head of education at the Art Gallery of Ontario; in 1969 she became Research Curator, and following that became the first Curator of Canadian Art (1970–1973). At the Gallery, she also served as the Acting Chief Curator (1972). From 1974 to 1999, Murray served as Director of the Robert McLaughlin Gallery in Oshawa. From 2005–2006, Murray served as the Interim Executive Director and Chief Executive Officer of the McMichael Canadian Art Collection in Kleinburg, Ontario after the unexpected resignation of Vincent Varga.

As one of only seven female art curators in Canada at the time of her AGO appointment, Murray advocated for the role of women in curatorial roles. She believed women were well-suited for these nurturing, essentially administrative roles.

== Writing ==
Murray has written extensively on the Group of Seven, particularly Tom Thomson. She has prepared a catalogue raisonné of his work, a project which took over fifty years. She also has authored many books on the history of Canadian art, most notably Canadian Art in the Twentieth Century (1999), Northern Lights: Masterpieces of Tom Thomson and the Group of Seven (1994), McMichael Canadian Art Collection: One Hundred Masterworks (2006), and Laura Muntz Lyall: Impressions of Women and Childhood (2012). She has published over one hundred catalogues and two hundred articles on subjects ranging from folk art to contemporary artists. Her collection of papers and over 600 interviews with artists are stored in Library and Archives Canada.

== Honours ==
Murray was elected to the Royal Society of Canada in 1992; and in 1993, received the Senior Award from the Association of Cultural Executives for her contributions to Canadian cultural life. She received the Award for Lifetime Achievement from the Ontario Association of Art Galleries in 2000. She received the Order of Ontario in 2003, and the Queen Elizabeth II Diamond Jubilee Medal in 2012. Murray was selected as University College, University of Toronto 2013 Alumni of Influence in 2013.

== Books ==
- Murray, Joan (1971). The Art of Tom Thomson. Toronto: Art Gallery of Ontario.
- Bruce, William Blair; Murray, Joan (1982), Letters Home, 1859-1906: The Letters of William Blair Bruce, Penumbra Press, ISBN 978-0-92080-636-4
- Murray, Joan; Fulford, Robert (1983), The Beginnings of Vision: The Drawings of Lawren S. Harris, Univ of Washington Pr, ISBN 978-0-29596-050-0
- Kurelek, William; Murray, Joan (1983), Kurelek's Vision of Canada, Hurtig, ISBN 978-0-88830-254-0
- Murray, Joan (1984), The Last Buffalo: The Story of Frederick Arthur Verner, Painter of the Canadian West, Pagurian Press, ISBN 978-0-88932-130-4
- ——— (1984). The Best of the Group of Seven. Edmonton: Hurtig Publishers. ISBN 978-0-77106-674-0.
- ——— (1986). The Best of Tom Thomson. Edmonton: Hurtig. ISBN 978-0-88830-299-1.
- ——— (1987), The Best Contemporary Canadian art, Hurtig, ISBN 978-0-88830-318-9
- ———; Harris, Lawren (1993), The Best of the Group of Seven (2nd ed.), McClelland & Stewart, ISBN 978-0-77106-674-0
- ——— (1994a). Northern Lights: Masterpieces of Tom Thomson and the Group of Seven. Toronto: Key Porter. ISBN 978-0-88665-347-7.
- ——— (1994b). Tom Thomson: The Last Spring. Toronto: Dundurn. ISBN 978-1-55002-218-6.
- ——— (1996). Tom Thomson: A Sketchbook. Toronto: Golden Press.
- ——— (1997), Home Truths: A Celebration of Family Life by Canada's Best-Loved Painters, Key Porter Books, ISBN 978-1-55013-882-5
- ——— (1998). Tom Thomson: Design for A Canadian Hero. Toronto: Dundurn. ISBN 978-1-55002-315-2.
- ——— (1999). Canadian Art in the Twentieth Century. Toronto: Dundurn. ISBN 978-1-55002-332-9.
- ——— (1999). Tom Thomson: Trees. Toronto: McArthur & Co. ISBN 978-1-55278-092-3.
- ——— (2002a). "Tom Thomson's Letters". In Reid, Dennis (ed.). Tom Thomson. Toronto/Ottawa: Art Gallery of Ontario/National Gallery of Canada. pp. 297–306. ISBN 978-1-55365-493-3.
- ——— (2002b). "Chronology". In Reid, Dennis (ed.). Tom Thomson. Toronto/Ottawa: Art Gallery of Ontario/National Gallery of Canada. pp. 307–317. ISBN 978-1-55365-493-3.
- ——— (2002c). Flowers: J. E. H. MacDonald, Tom Thomson and the Group of Seven. Toronto: McArthur & Co. ISBN 978-1-55278-326-9.
- ——— (2003), Lawren Harris: An Introduction to His Life and Art, Firefly Books, ISBN 978-1-55297-764-4
- ——— (2004). Water: Lawren Harris and the Group of Seven. Toronto: McArthur & Co. ISBN 978-1-55278-457-0.
- ——— (2006). Rocks: Franklin Carmichael, Arthur Lismer, and the Group of Seven. Toronto: McArthur & Co. pp. 92–7. ISBN 978-1-55278-616-1.
- ——— (2008), Michael Adamson: Open Country Paintings, vol. 1, Panda Group Canada, p. 205, ISBN 978-0-9811116-0-5
- ——— (2010), The Art of Florence Vale, Art Gallery of Peel, ISBN 978-0-98115-072-7
- ——— (2011). A Treasury of Tom Thomson. Toronto: Douglas & McIntyre. ISBN 978-1-55365-886-3.
- ——— (2012). Laura Muntz Lyall: Impressions of Women and Childhood. Montreal: McGill-Queen's University Press. ISBN 9780773540989.
