= MS Normac =

Floating restaurant boat

Coordinates: 43.207342°N 79.261513°W

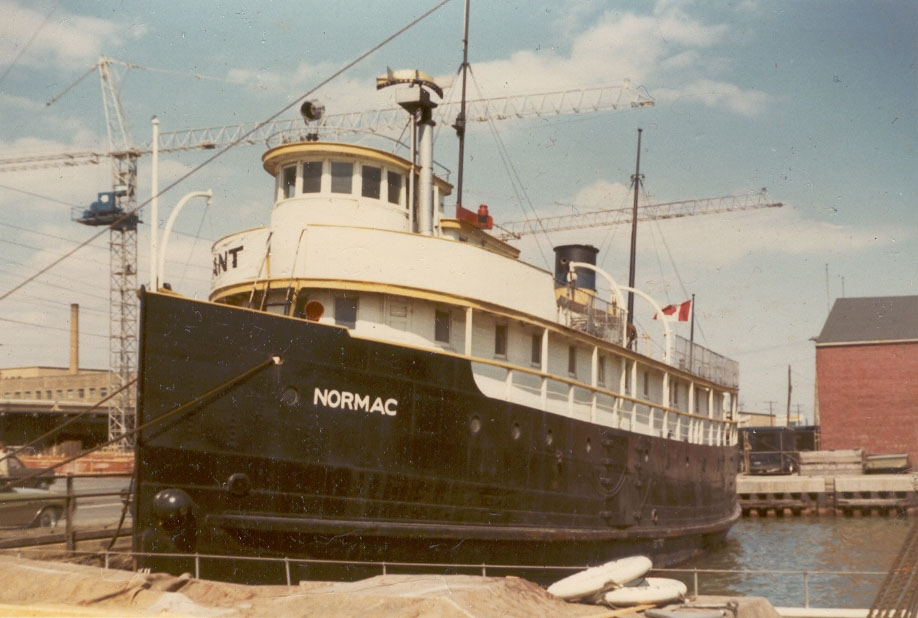
- The MS Normac in Toronto Harbour

History

Canada
- Name: James R. Elliot (1902-1930); Normac (1930-present)
- Owner: Detroit Fire Department (1902-1930); Owen Sound Transportation (1930-1968); Don Lee (1968-1969); John Letnik (1969-1986); Port Dalhousie Pier Marina (present)
- Builder: Jenks Shipbuilding Company, Port Huron, Michigan
- Launched: November 29, 1902
- Out of service: 1969
- Status: restaurant ship moored at Port Dalhousie Pier Marina

General characteristics
- Type: Steamship
- Tonnage: 210 GRT
- Length: 110 ft
- Beam: 25 ft
- Depth: 12 ft
- Propulsion: 1893 Cowles Double high pressure non-condensing steam engine

Normac is a floating restaurant boat that was launched as a fire tug, named the James R. Elliot. She was built at the Jenks Shipbuilding Company in Port Huron, Michigan, in 1902. After serving as a tug, the boat was later used as a ferry boat on Lake Huron until 1968 when it was retired. It was then converted into a floating restaurant in Toronto. After sinking in Toronto, the boat was raised and sold to be used as a floating restaurant in St Catharines, Ontario.

== History ==
After she lost her usefulness as a fire tug, she was sold in 1930 to the Owen Sound Transportation Company. At that time, she was taken to the Georgian Bay Shipbuilding Company at Midland for conversion into a combination package freighter and passenger ferry, and from a steamer to a diesel powered vessel, at a cost of CA$80,000 (equivalent to $1,443,516 in 2025). The vessel was renamed the Normac which was the namesake of captain "Norman Mckay," founder and general manager of the Owen Sound Transportation Company. Mckay was the captain of the company flagship SS Manitoulin.

The Normac sailed the Owen Sound to Sault Ste. Marie route via Killarney and the North Channel, commencing July 16, 1931. From 1932, she sailed the Manitoulin Island - Tobermory route and in later years, along this same route with the SS Norisle. In December 1940, the crew of the Normac rescued two lighthouse keepers stranded outside Tobermory by ice. The Normac broke up the ice surrounding the lighthouse to make a path for the lighthouse keepers' boat to navigate the ice.

After the MS Norgoma was converted to diesel fuel and placed on the Tobermory run, in 1964 the Normac took up the role as an automobile ferry across the North Channel from Meldrum Bay to Blind River and Cockburn Island, a portion of its original run from Owen Sound. Normac remained on this route until the close of the 1968 season when she was retired. She was sold to Donald F. Lee of Port Lambton Ontario, and moved from Owen Sound to Wallaceburg Ontario, where she spent the winter.

She was then sold for CA$30,000 in 1969 to Toronto restauranteur John Letnik. At a cost of CA$100,000 (equivalent to $808,867 in 2025), Letnick converted the Normac into Captain John's Harbour Boat Restaurant, a floating restaurant in Toronto Harbour. The Normac arrived at Toronto in her Owen Sound colours, and was soon painted all white. Shortly afterward the steel hull was repainted bright red, to make it more noticeable from the street. The Normac was permanently moored at the foot of Yonge Street.

The Normac's hull was punctured in 1981 when the Toronto Island ferry Trillium struck her, causing a slow leak and her sinking two weeks later. Letnik sued and failed to get the Metro Toronto Parks Department to pay for the boat. A court decided that Letnik had had the time to repair the leak but failed to do so. On top of the court loss, Letnik was ordered to remove the hull from the harbour.

The Normac was raised in 1986 and refurbished by Letnik to again serve as a floating restaurant. Letnik was invited by the city of Cleveland, Ohio to dock the boat there, but the city and Letnik could not come to agreeable terms. The boat was instead installed at the marina at Port Dalhousie, Ontario. Owned by Nino Donatelli, she served as "Tokyo Joe's Marina Bar and Grill", a floating restaurant and cocktail lounge until she was gutted by fire in 2011. She was restored and became the Riverboat Mexican Grill. The ship remains docked at Port Dalhousie Pier Marina as a restaurant.
