= SS Manitoulin (1889) =

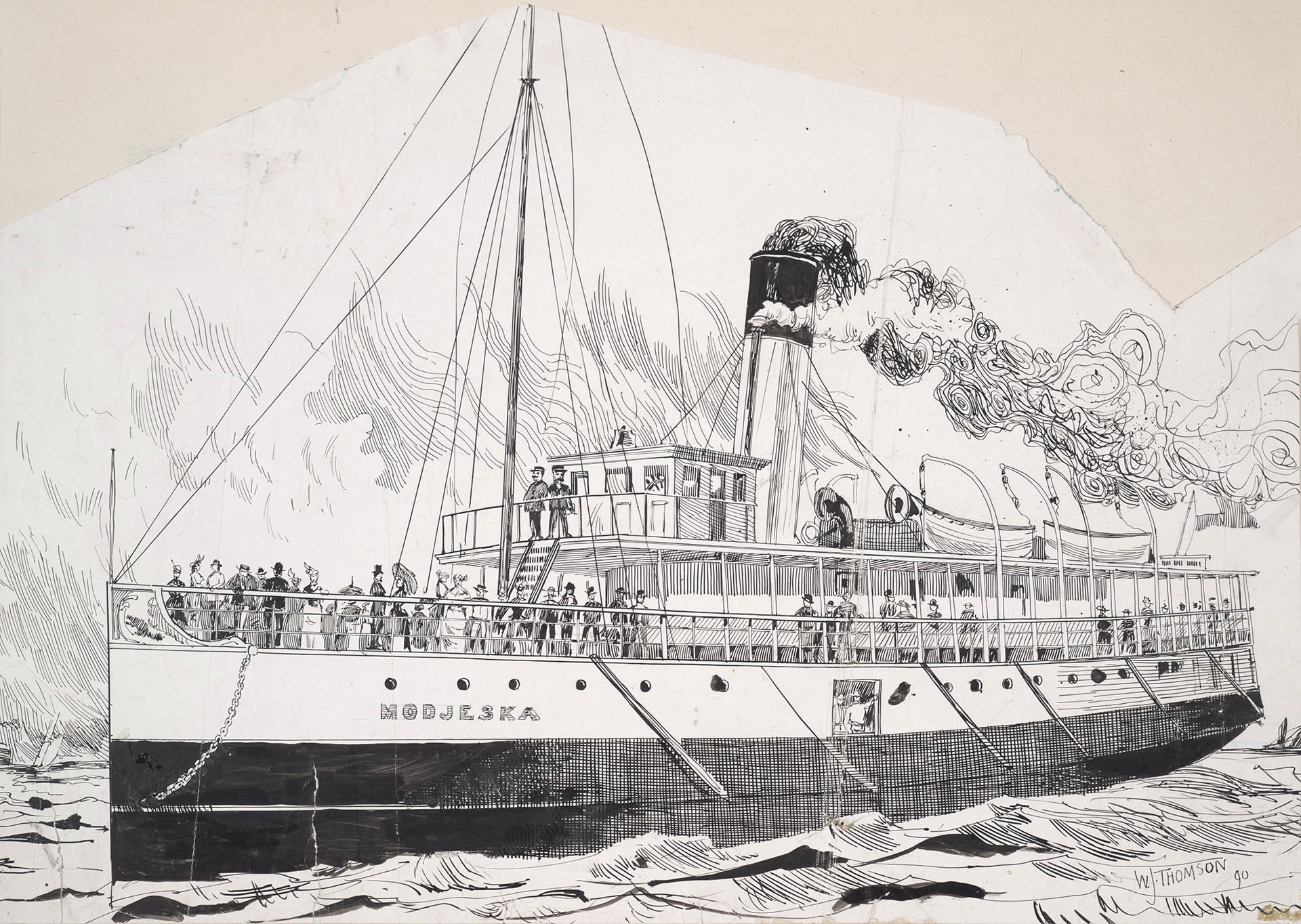
- The ship as Modjeska

History

Canada
- Name: 1889: Modjeska; 1927: Manitoulin
- Namesake: 1927: Manitoulin Island
- Owner: 1889: Hamilton Steamboat Co; 1911: Niagara Navigation Co Ltd; 1915: Canada Steamship Lines; 1926: Owen Sound Transportation Co Ltd; 1950: Louis Cadesky
- Port of registry: 1889: Hamilton, Ontario; 1926: Owen Sound
- Builder: Napier, Shanks & Bell, Yoker
- Yard number: 46
- Launched: 13 April 1889
- Out of service: 1949
- Identification: UK official number 96058
- Fate: Scrapped 1953

General characteristics
- Type: passenger ship
- Tonnage: as built: 454 GRT, 23 NRT; as rebuilt: 913 GRT, 453 NRT
- Length: 178.0 ft (54.3 m)
- Beam: 31.1 ft (9.5 m)
- Depth: 12.3 ft (3.7 m)
- Installed power: 166 NHP
- Propulsion: 2 × screws; 2 × triple-expansion engines
- Capacity: as rebuilt: 150 passengers

SS Manitoulin was a Great Lakes passenger steamship. She was built in 1889 as Modjeska, and renamed Manitoulin in 1927 after a major refit. She was laid up in 1949 and scrapped in 1953.

== Building ==
Napier, Shanks and Bell built Modjeska in Yoker, Glasgow, Scotland, launching her on 13 April 1889. Her registered length was 178.0 ft (54.3 m), her beam was 31.1 ft (9.5 m) and her depth was 12.3 ft (3.7 m). She was a twin-screw steamship, and each of her screws was driven by a triple-expansion steam engine built by Dunsmuir and Jackson Ltd. of Govan. Between them her twin engines were rated at 166 NHP. Her construction was inspired by the success experienced by the Hamilton Steamboat Company's earlier Glasgow-built vessel, Macassa.

== Modjeska ==
Modjeska was an excursion steamer on Lake Ontario. Her first owner was the Hamilton Steamboat Co Ltd, which registered her in Hamilton, Ontario. Her United Kingdom official number was 96058. Her ownership passed to the Niagara Steam Navigation Co Ltd in 1911 and Canada Steamship Lines Ltd in 1915.

On June 13, 1903, the Modjeska was involved in an early Canadian demonstration of ship-to-shore wireless transmission. While the ship was about 20 miles offshore, members of the American De Forest Wireless Co. exchanged messages with company engineers, scientists and dignitaries on shore in Toronto.

== Manitoulin ==
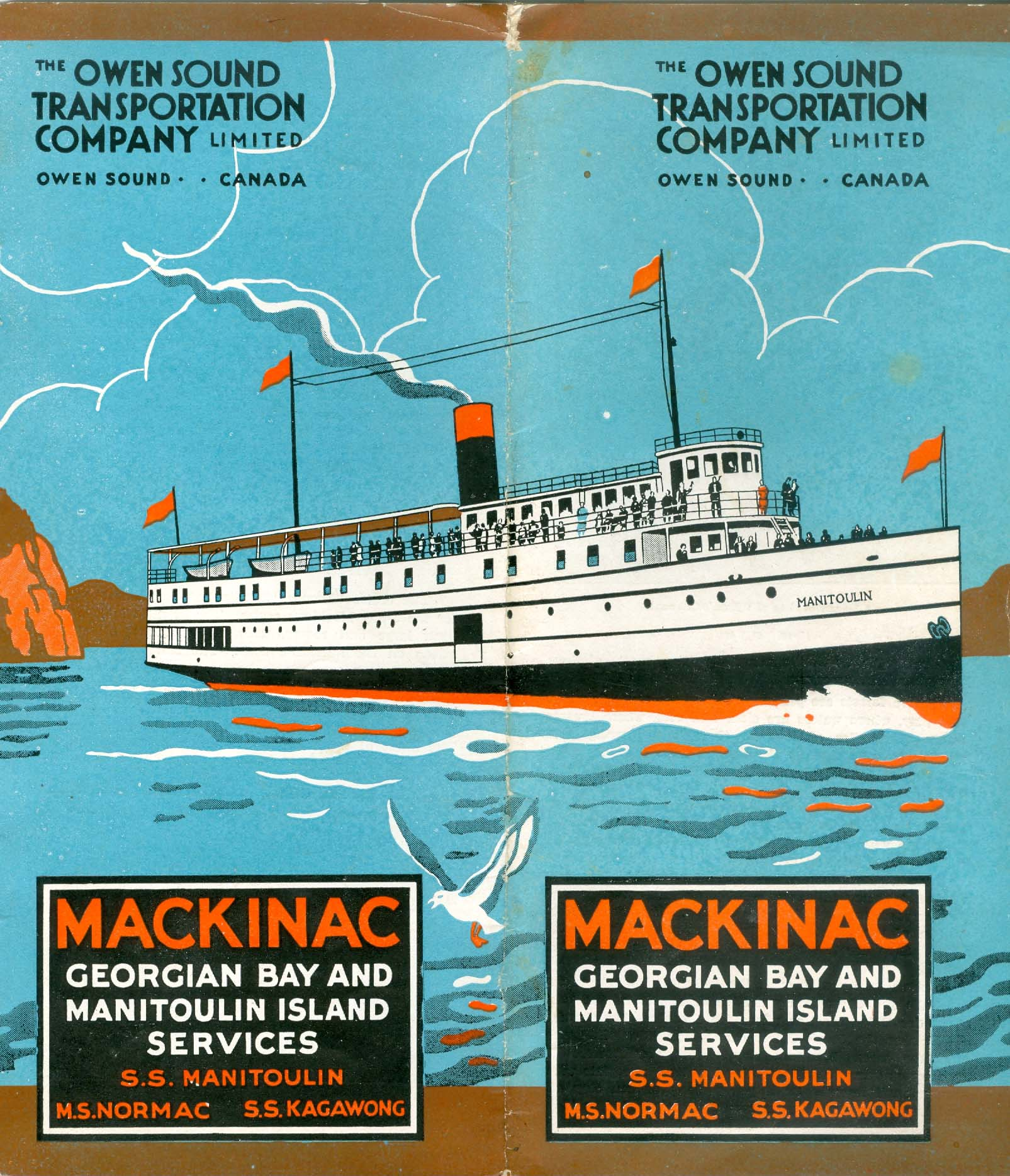
1931 Owen Sound Transportation Company poster featuring Manitoulin

In 1926 the Owen Sound Transportation Company acquired Modjeska in damaged condition, had her refitted, renamed her Manitoulin and moved her to Owen Sound. The refit provided cabins and staterooms for up to 150 passengers and increased her tonnages to 913 GRT and 453 NRT.

In 1949 Manitoulin was laid up, and in 1950 Norgoma replaced her. Manitoulin was stripped in 1951 at Port Dalhousie, Ontario and scrapped in late 1953 at Port Weller Dry Docks.

== Bibliography ==
- Lloyd's Register of Shipping. Vol. I–Steamers. London: Lloyd's Register of Shipping. 1914.
- Lloyd's Register of Shipping (PDF). Vol. I–Steamers & Motorships. London: Lloyd's Register of Shipping. 1930 – via Southampton City Council.
- Pearen, Shelley J (2001). Exploring Manitoulin. Toronto: University of Toronto Press. p. 24. ISBN 978-0-8020-8461-3.
