= SS Manasoo =

Canadian steamship launched in 1888

Coordinates: 44°51′03.6″N 80°52′08.0″W

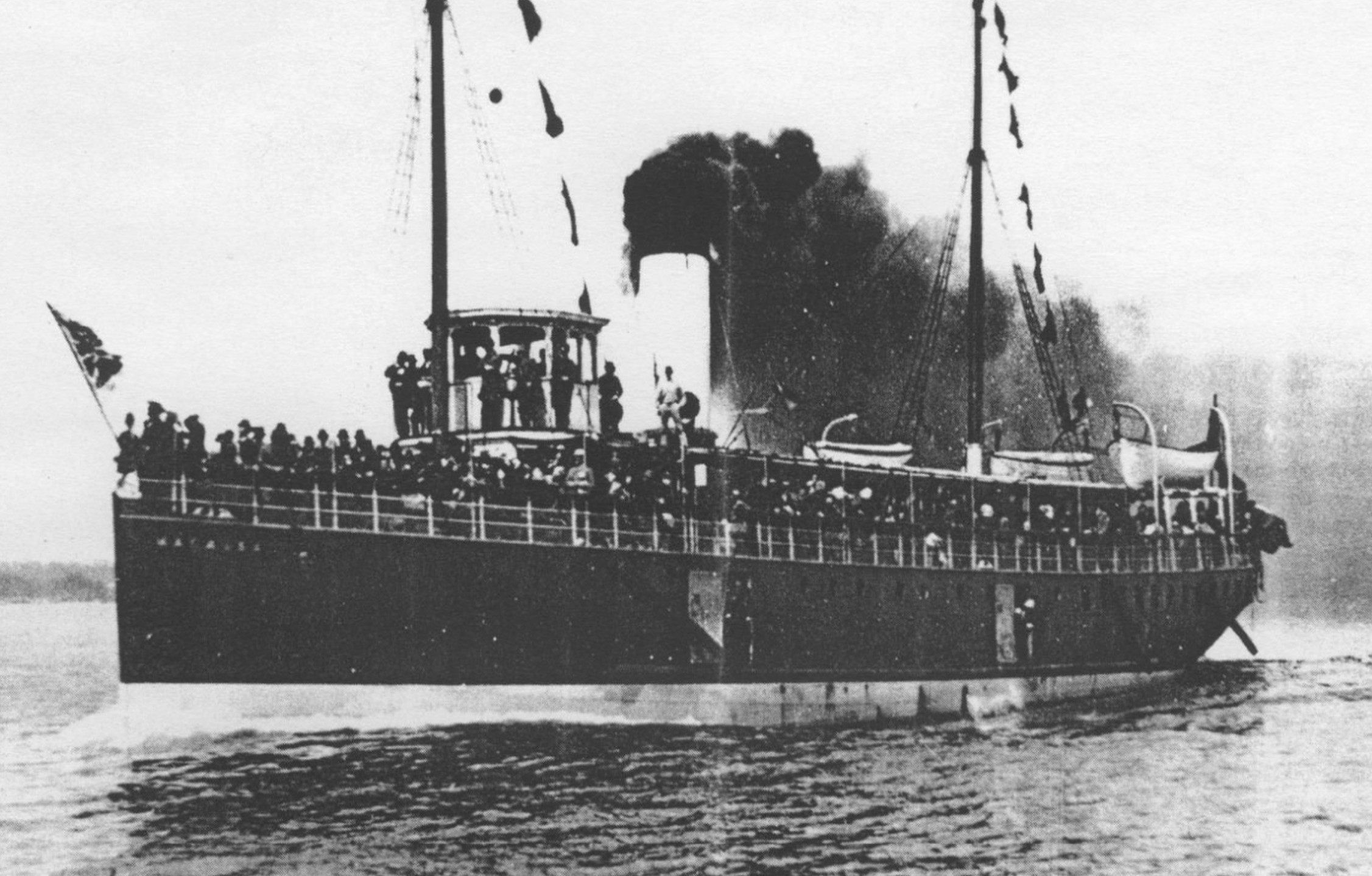
- Macassa before she was rebuilt in 1905

History

Canada
- Name: Macassa (1888–1928); Manasoo (1928–1928)
- Owner: Hamilton Steamboat Company (1888–1911); Niagara Navigation Company (1911–1912); Richelieu & Ontario Navigation Company (1912–1913); Canada Steamship Lines (1913–1927); Owen Sound Transportation Company, Ltd. (1927–1928)
- Port of registry: Hamilton, Ontario
- Ordered: 1887
- Builder: William Hamilton & Company of Port Glasgow, Scotland
- Yard number: 64
- In service: May 2, 1888
- Out of service: September 15, 1928
- Identification: Canadian official number 93932
- Fate: Sank in a storm on Lake Huron
- Notes: Wreck discovered June 30, 2018

General characteristics
- Type: Passenger and package freighter
- Tonnage: 574 GRT (1888–1905); 529 GRT (1905–1928); 459 NRT (1888–1905); 234 NRT (1905–1928)
- Length: 155 feet (47.2 m) (1888–1905); 178.4 feet (54.4 m) (1905–1928)
- Beam: 24.1 feet (7.3 m)
- Depth: 16.3 feet (5.0 m)
- Installed power: Engine: 2 × 410 hp (310 kW) 135 rpm triple expansion steam engines; Boilers: 1 × 150 pounds per square inch (1,000 kPa) Scotch marine boiler
- Propulsion: 2 × fixed pitch propellers
- Speed: 18 knots (20.7 mph)
- Capacity: 1,500 long tons (1,524 t) (post 1905)

SS Manasoo (originally named Macassa) was a steel-hulled Canadian passenger and package freighter in service between 1888 and 1928. She was built in 1888 in Port Glasgow, Scotland, by William Hamilton & Company for the Hamilton Steamboat Company of Hamilton, Ontario, who used her as a passenger transport between Hamilton and Toronto, Ontario. Macassa was lengthened in Collingwood, Ontario, in 1905. She was sold twice before being sold to the Owen Sound Transportation Company, Ltd., and was rebuilt and renamed Manasoo; after the sale, she mainly operated between Sault Ste. Marie and Owen Sound, Ontario.

After a lucrative shipping season in 1928, Manasoo was open to take on special commissions. On September 14, she left the Manitoulin Island port of Manitowaning, Ontario, under the command of Captain John McKay. There were nineteen crewmen, two passengers, 115 cows and one bull on board. By the time Manasoo had cleared the North Channel of Lake Huron, a sizeable storm had developed. By 2:00 a.m. the next day, Manasoo had begun to list to port. Despite efforts to correct it, the list worsened. As she was off Griffith Island, Manasoo rolled over and sank. Five crewmen and one passenger climbed onto a life raft; one of the crew later died of exposure, while the rest were rescued by the steamer Manitoba. Sixteen people died in the wreck.

The location of Manasoo's wreck was unknown for nearly 90 years, until it was found on June 30, 2018, by Jerry Eliason and Ken Merryman of Minnesota, and Cris Kohl of Windsor, Ontario. The wreck rests intact in 210 feet (64.0 m) of water, with its stern embedded in the lake bottom.

== History ==
=== Design and construction ===
Beginning in the mid-1840s, Canadian companies began importing iron vessels, prefabricated by shipyards in the United Kingdom. It would not be until 1889, however, that the first steel-hulled Canadian ship, Manitoba, was built on the Great Lakes. In 1887, the Hamilton Steamboat Company, a fleet managed by Tunis Bruce Griffith of Hamilton, Ontario, placed an order for a steel steamship with William Hamilton & Company, a shipyard located on the banks of the River Clyde in Port Glasgow, Scotland.

Hull number 64, built at William Hamilton & Company's Glen Yard, was christened Macassa. She was licensed to carry 536 passengers, and was equipped with an elegant interior consisting of carved, polished hardwood panels, velvet sofas, silk curtains and velvet carpets. She was also equipped with electric lights. Macassa had only a single tall mast, which was located behind her pilothouse. With the exception of a small cabin designed to shelter the passengers and crew, the promenade deck was completely open, while her main deck was enclosed.

Macassa was clinker built. Her hull was 155 feet (47.2 m) long. Her beam was 24.1 feet (7.3 m) wide, while her hull was 16.3 feet (5.0 m) (some sources state 16 feet (4.9 m) or 16.25 feet (5.0 m)) deep. Macassa had a gross tonnage of 574 tons, and a net tonnage of 459 tons. (Note: One source lists Macassa's length as 154.45 feet (47.1 m), while another lists her overall length at 166 feet (50.6 m). Her beam is also listed as 24 feet (7.3 m), and her depth at 16 feet (4.9 m) or 16.25 feet (5.0 m).)

She was powered by two 410 hp (310 kW) 135 rpm triple-expansion steam engines; the cylinders of the engines were 11 inches (27.9 cm), 18 inches (45.7 cm) and 29 inches (73.7 cm) in diameter, and had a stroke of 22 inches (55.9 cm). Steam for the engine was provided by a single coal-fired, 12.6-by-10.9-foot (3.8 m × 3.3 m) Scotch marine boiler, which had a working pressure of 150 pounds per square inch (1,000 kPa). The engines were built by William Kemp of Glasgow, Scotland, while the boiler was manufactured by Burnett & Company of Govan. Macassa had a top speed of 18 knots (20.7 mph), and was propelled by two fixed pitch propellers.

=== Service history ===
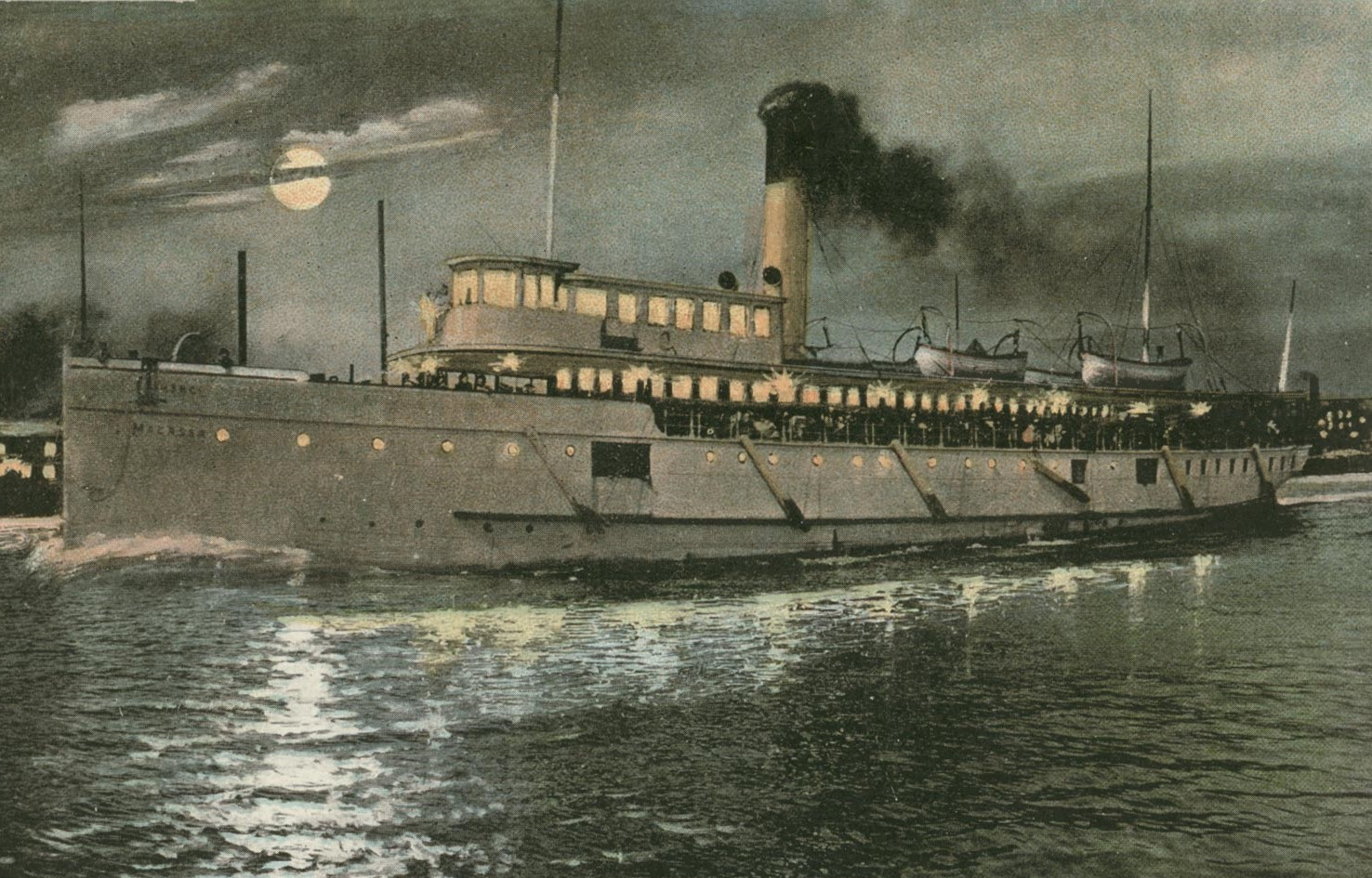
Macassa c. 1906

Macassa was accepted by the Hamilton Steamboat Company after she completed her sea trials on the River Clyde. She was registered in Glasgow, Scotland, on May 2, 1888, and left for Hamilton on May 16. Newspapers in 1888 speculated that Macassa would arrive at her destination on around June 1.

After Macassa arrived in Hamilton on the morning of June 7, she was given the Canadian official number 93932 on June 29, 1888, when she was registered in Hamilton. For most of her career, she was engaged in the passenger trade between Hamilton and Toronto, Ontario. Early in her career, she also stopped at Lorne Park, Oakville and Burlington Beach, Ontario.

While in Hamilton on August 11, 1892, a deckhand on board Macassa leaned against a gangway whilst trying to fill a bucket of water, fell overboard and drowned. She made a 39-mile (62.8 km) trip between Burlington and Port Dalhousie, Ontario, on April 6, 1894, in an hour and fifty minutes.

In an effort to make Macassa more profitable, she was sent to the Collingwood Shipbuilding Company of Collingwood, Ontario, in 1905 to be lengthened. Her hull became 178.4 feet (54.4 m) long, her gross tonnage 529 tons, her net tonnage 234 tons, and her carrying capacity 1,500 long tons (1,524 t); the reason behind the reduction of her tonnage after the lengthening is unknown. The new piece was inserted between her pilothouse and funnel. Officers' quarters were constructed behind the pilothouse, the cabin on the promenade deck was enlarged, her mast was moved behind the pilothouse, and a second mast was installed aft. The lengthening significantly decreased Macassa's length-to-beam ratio, causing her to roll badly even in moderate weather. On September 19, 1906, a deckhand on board Macassa lost his foot after it became entangled in a mooring line while she was in Hamilton.

In 1911, the Hamilton Steamboat Company merged into the Niagara Navigation Company, a company that operated passenger ships between Toronto and various Niagara River ports. In 1912, the Niagara Navigation Company was absorbed into the Richelieu & Ontario Navigation Company, which itself was merged into the Canada Transportation Company of Montreal, Quebec, on June 11, 1913. The Canada Transportation Company was renamed Canada Steamship Lines later in 1913.

Late in the summer of 1912, Macassa ran a special service from Coburg, Port Hope, Bowmanville, and Oshawa, Ontario, to Toronto, where she ferried passengers to and from the Canadian National Exhibition. While with Canada Steamship Lines, Macassa frequently travelled between Grimsby, Ontario, Hamilton and Toronto. She was used as the official boat for the Wrigley Marathon Swim. At the end of the 1927 shipping season, Macassa was laid up in Toronto.

In the winter of 1927, Macassa was sold to the Owen Sound Transportation Company of Owen Sound, Ontario, and was rebuilt as a nightboat in Toronto. Macassa was renamed Manasoo, a combination of Manitoulin Island and Sault Ste. Marie, Ontario. Her promenade deck was covered with passenger cabins, and her pilothouse and masts were replaced. After her rebuild, she was licensed to carry only 70 passengers.

Manasoo left for Owen Sound on April 22, 1928. Along the way, she stopped in Goderich, Lion's Head and Wiarton, Ontario. After entering service in May, she mainly operated between Sault Ste. Marie and Owen Sound, via the North Channel. Manasoo carried passengers and various types of freight.

=== Final voyage ===
After the lucrative 1928 shipping season, Manasoo was open to special commissions. Cowman Donald Wallace of Oil Springs, Ontario, and his friend Thomas Lambert (also of Oil Springs) drove to Owen Sound, where they boarded Manasoo. Wallace had planned to purchase cattle from several farmers from around Manitoulin Island. Under the command of Captain John McKay, Manasoo began her voyage on September 13. She sailed to West Bay, Ontario, and then she proceeded to Manitowaning, Ontario, where she loaded two automobiles. She left Manitowaning for Owen Sound at 12:00 p.m. on September 14, with 19 crewmen, two passengers, 115 cows and one bull on board. By the time Manasoo had cleared the North Channel of Lake Huron, a sizeable storm had developed. By 2:00 a.m. the next day, Manasoo had begun to list to port. Captain McKay eventually decided to beach Manasoo on nearby Griffith Island. After some time, Manasoo's starboard bilge lifted out of the water, causing water to leak in through gangways and other openings. Only one lifeboat was launched before Manasoo rolled over onto her port side, and sank stern first.

Manasoo sank in three to five minutes. The only lifeboat launched capsized. A life raft broke loose when Manasoo sank; only six of the crew, including Captain McKay were able to climb aboard. One of the crew, Chief Engineer Thomas McCutcheon, died of exposure, and his clothes were distributed among the survivors. After floating on the raft for over 60 hours, the survivors were rescued by the Canadian Pacific Railway steamer Manitoba. Sixteen of the 21 people on board died. Although the specific reason for Manasoo's sinking remains unknown, the shifting of the cattle is believed to be partly responsible.

== Manasoo wreck ==
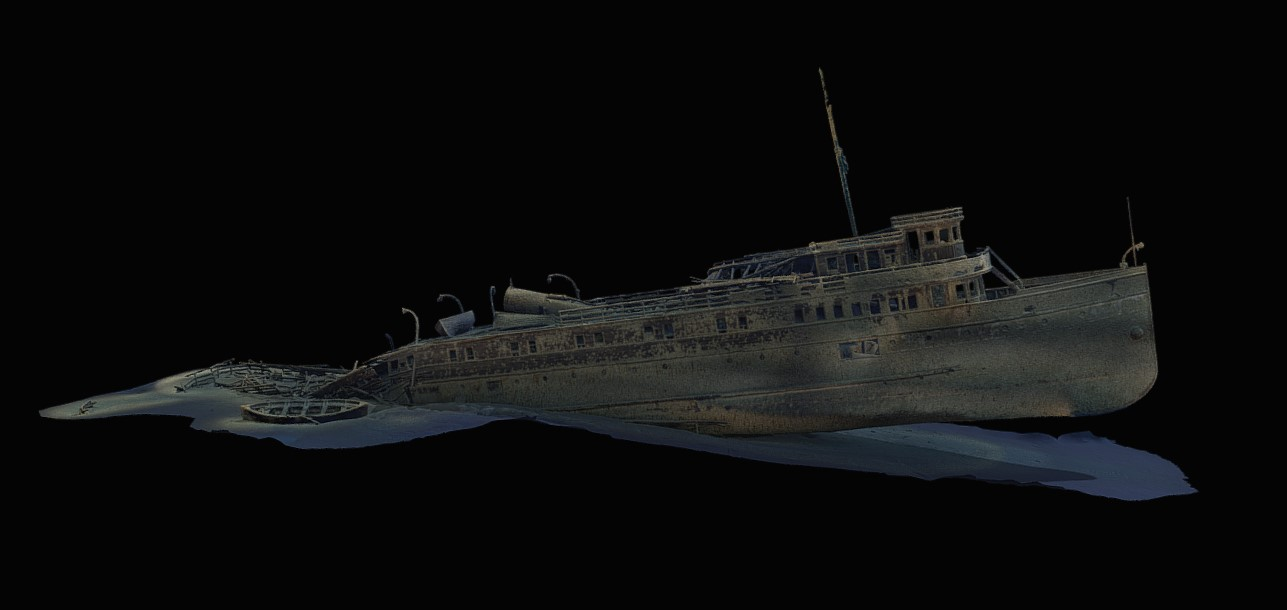
Manasoo's wreck

=== Discovery ===
It was rumoured that Manasoo had previously been discovered by a diver resting in 150 feet (45.7 m) of water, 0.5 miles (0.8 km) from shore. Her wreck was discovered on June 30, 2018, after a four-day search using side-scan sonar, by shipwreck hunters Jerry Eliason and Ken Merryman of Minnesota, and maritime historian Cris Kohl of Windsor, Ontario. Eliason and Merryman had unsuccessfully tried to locate her in 2017. After searching more than 30 square miles (77.7 km^{2}) of water, Kohl suggested that they look closer to shore. He had found a newspaper account published in 1928, which stated that Manasoo's wreck had been located a few weeks after she sank.

=== Manasoo today ===
The wreck of Manasoo rests in 210 feet (64.0 m) of water, 0.5 miles (0.8 km) off Griffith Island. The wreck is intact, although encrusted with zebra mussels, with its stern buried in the lake bottom and the bow pointing upwards at a 10° to 15° angle. The pilothouse and helm are intact. Manasoo's collapsed funnel and two of her lifeboats are located on her deck, while another lies next to her wreck. Also within the wreck is Wallace's 1927 Chevrolet coupé, with its number plates still attached.

== Sources ==
- Alpena County George N. Fletcher Public Library (2021a). "Macassa (1888, Propeller)". Alpena, Michigan: Alpena County George N. Fletcher Public Library.
- Alpena County George N. Fletcher Public Library (2021b). "Manitoba (1889, Passenger Steamer)". Alpena, Michigan: Alpena County George N. Fletcher Public Library.
- Beaupre, Ronald F. (2001). "Ship of the Month No.262: Manitoba". Toronto, Ontario: Toronto Marine Historical Society.
- "Body of Dougal McLean, Fireman, Recovered". Owen Sound, Ontario: The Sun Times. 1928 – via Newspapers.com.
- Bowling Green State University (2021). "Macassa". Bowling Green, Ohio: Bowling Green State University.
- Boyd, Ellsworth (2019). "'Cursed Ship' S.S. Manasoo Discovered Intact". Los Alamos, New Mexico: National Underwater and Marine Agency.
- Bugbee, Gordon P. (1962). "Iron Merchant Ships: An Upper Lakes Centennial - Part One" (PDF). Detroit, Michigan: Great Lakes Maritime Institute.
- Copland, John A. (1898). "Passenger Steamers. Toronto a Great Centre of Traffic. The Growth of Travel. An Account of the Several Lines". Toronto, Ontario: The Globe.
- "Deckhand's Foot Cut Off". Windsor, Ontario: The Windsor Star. 1906 – via Newspapers.com.
- "Dominion Dots". Winnipeg, Manitoba: Manitoba Weekly Free Press. 1888 – via Newspapers.com.
- Dunn, Scott (2018). "Shipwreck near Wiarton 'one of the most beautiful'". Owen Sound, Ontario: Owen Sound Sun Times.
- Eliason, Jerry (2020). "Shipwreck Manasoo". Fridley, Minnesota: Great Lakes Shipwreck Preservation Society.
- Fox, William Sherwood (2002) [1952]. The Bruce Beckons: The Story of Lake Huron's Great Peninsula. Toronto, Ontario: University of Toronto Press. ISBN 978-1-295703-28-9.
- Gebel, Meira (2018). "Divers in Lake Huron find 1927 Chevrolet Coupe in ship wreckage". Detroit, Michigan: Detroit Free Press.
- Gmiter, Tanda (2018). "90-year-old shipwreck, caused by herd of cows, discovered in Lake Huron". Grand Rapids, Michigan: Booth Newspapers.
- "Hamilton Bay Fatality". St. Catharines, Ontario: St. Catharines Standard. 1892 – via Newspapers.com.
- Herriman, H. N. (1912). "Great Lakes Register 1912". Cleveland, Ohio: Great Lakes Register.
- Hill, Sharon (2018). "90 years later, 'ghost' shipwreck at bottom of Lake Huron in remarkable shape". Windsor, Ontario: Windsor Star.
- "In And Around The City Fatality". St. Catharines, Ontario: St. Catharines Standard. 1894 – via Newspapers.com.
- Inland Lloyd's (1902). "Inland Lloyds Lake Vessel Register 1902 – Canadian Hulls". Toronto, Ontario: Inland Lloyd's.
- "Macassa". Caledonia, Scotland: Caledonian Maritime Research Trust. 2022.
- "Macassa Lengthened". Buffalo, New York: Buffalo Evening News. 1905 – via Newspapers.com.
- "Marine Intelligence". Kingston, Ontario: The Kingston Whig–Standard. 1888 – via Newspapers.com.
- McCutcheon, Alicia (2018). "The Manasoo shipwreck saga continues". Little Current, Ontario: The Manitoulin Expositor.
- "Officers of S.S. Manasoo Are Blamed". Windsor, Ontario: The Windsor Star. 1928 – via Newspapers.com.
- "Planes Seek 16 From Lost Lake Vessel". Windsor, Ontario: The Windsor Star. 1928 – via Newspapers.com.
- "Str. Manasoo to Arrive in Port Friday Evening". Owen Sound, Ontario: The Sun Times. 1928 – via Newspapers.com.
- "The Owen Sound Daily Sun-Times, Tuesday, September 18, 1928". Owen Sound, Ontario: The Sun Times. 1928 – via Newspapers.com.
- "The Sinking of the Manasoo". Owen Sound, Ontario: The Sun Times. 2008 – via Newspapers.com.
- Swayze, David (2001). "Great Lakes Shipwrecks – M". Port Huron, Michigan: Boatnerd. Archived from the original on June 15, 2002.
- The Marine Review (1909). "The Marine Review (Cleveland, OH), 18 Mar 1909". Cleveland, Ohio: The Marine Review.
- Toronto Marine Historical Society (1979). "The Scanner – Ship of the Month No.88: Macassa". Toronto, Ontario: Toronto Marine Historical Society.
