= SS Norisle =

Coordinates: 45.742854°N 81.804277°W

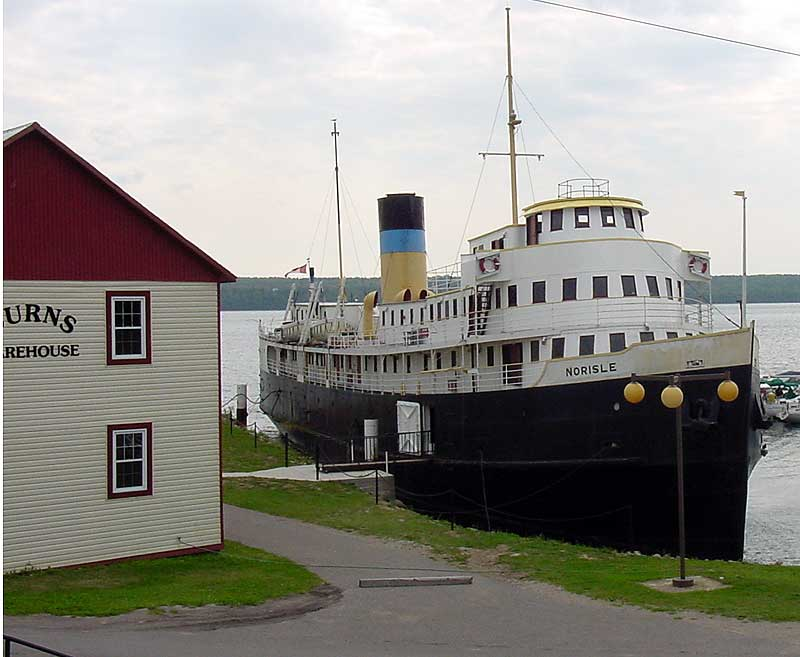
- Norisle at the Manitowaning Heritage Complex in October 2006

History

Canada
- Name: Norisle
- Owner: Owen Sound Transportation Company
- Port of registry: Owen Sound
- Builder: Collingwood Shipbuilding, Collingwood
- In service: September 1946
- Out of service: 1974
- Identification: UK official number 176112; call sign VXZZ
- Fate: Scrapped February 2024

General characteristics
- Type: Car and passenger ferry
- Tonnage: 1,668 GRT, 1,360 NRT
- Length: 215 ft 8 in (65.74 m)
- Beam: 36 ft 1 in (11.00 m)
- Draft: 16 ft (4.9 m)
- Depth: 12 ft 7 in (3.84 m)
- Installed power: 1,000 hp (746 kW)
- Propulsion: 1 × triple expansion steam engine
- Speed: 12 knots (22 km/h; 14 mph)
- Capacity: 200 passengers and up to 50 vehicles

SS Norisle was a Canadian steam-powered automobile ferry that operated between Tobermory and South-Baymouth Manitoulin Island alongside her sister ships, the MS Norgoma and the MS Normac, owned by the Owen Sound Transportation Company.

The name Norisle was derived from "Nor", a contraction of the Northern Region of Lake Huron, and "Isle", referring to Manitoulin Island. After use as a museum ship from 1975, she was scrapped in 2023

== Ferry operations ==
Norisle was built at the Collingwood shipyards in 1946; the first steamship built in Canada after the end of World War II. Her engines were designed and built for a Royal Canadian Navy corvette, but because of the end of the war, they were installed in Norisle instead. They are now the only remaining engines of their type in existence today. The ship had two doors on the starboard with a ramp that allowed vehicles to drive on and off the vessel during her service as a ferry. She sailed until the year 1974, when she and her sister ship, Norgoma, were replaced by the much larger and more modern MS Chi-Cheemaun which could accommodate a much larger number of automobiles, and passengers (but no livestock).

== Retirement ==
Norisle was purchased by the town of Assiginack in 1975 for $1, and was permanently berthed at the Assiginack Museum Complex on Manitoulin Island as a museum ship for tourists to explore. For the last few years she had also served as a training ground for Canadian Naval Cadets.

In later years, Norisle fell into a state of disrepair. The ship was slowly sinking due to rainwater entering through her engine room vents and the main smokestack. This issue was stopped by placing tarpaulins over the ingress points. City leaders planned on having her towed to deep water and sunk as a dive site, however these plans have been halted because a support group for Norisle was formed in March 2007, "Friends of the Norisle." The group planned to investigate refurbishing or using the ship for beneficial purposes.

Efforts failed and the ship was towed to Marine Recycling Corporation in Port Colborne in 2023 for scrapping.
