= Owen Sound Transportation Company =

Owen Sound Transportation Company, Limited
- Type: Ontario business corporation
- Industry: Ferry transportation services
- Founded: 1921; 105 years ago
- Headquarters: Owen Sound, Ontario, Canada
- Parent: Ontario Northland Transportation Commission
- Website: ontarioferries.com

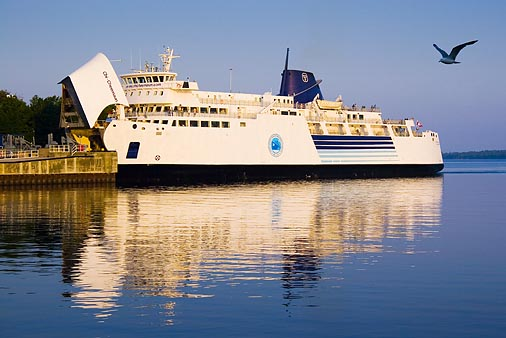
MV Chi-Cheemaun at Tobermory

SS Norisle departing South Baymouth, June 1974

The Owen Sound Transportation Company, Limited (OSTC) provides seasonal ferry services within Ontario, Canada. Based in Owen Sound, the company operates the MS Chi-Cheemaun between Tobermory and South Baymouth; the MV Niska I between Moosonee and Moose Factory Island; the MV Pelee Islander, and MV Pelee Islander II between Kingsville/Leamington and Pelee Island. The MV Pelee Islander is also operated between Pelee Island and Sandusky, Ohio.

== History ==
=== Establishment ===
The Owen Sound Transportation Company was established by businessmen in the Owen Sound area in 1921. These included W. G. Hay, president; J. H. Hay, vice president; and J. Garvey, secretary-treasurer. These three men were also associated with the Owen Sound-based North American Bent Chair Company. Their objective was to use the company's steamship, SS Michipicoten, in freight-only service from Owen Sound to isolated communities along the north shore of Lake Huron and Manitoulin Island.

It is likely the intended purpose of the navigation company was to procure the materials necessary for the manufacture of the North American Bent Chair Company's Bentwood furniture, as well as the transportation of packaged freight from Owen Sound. It was the objective of the officers of the firm to carry on the business of the furniture manufacturer as a subsidiary of Owen Sound Transportation Company (OSTC).

=== Passenger ferry service ===
Early in 1921, a rumor circulated through Owen Sound—a new steamboat line was being formed to re-establish cruises to the popular tourist destination of Mackinac Island. Promoted by a Collingwood steamship line, from the late nineteenth century until about 1903 these steamboat excursions crossing Lake Huron were popular from the Georgian Bay area. But it was not until the spring of 1926 that Captain Norman McKay arranged a public meeting through the Owen Sound Board of Trade to raise funds for the purchase of a steamship and refit it for reopening direct traffic between Owen Sound and other points on the Mackinac route. In 1926 the Owen Sound Transportation Company Limited was granted supplementary letters patent, under the Ontario Companies Act, increasing its authorized capital stock from $40,000 to $150,000.

In 1926 the OSTC purchased the steel-hulled, screw steamer SS Modjeska, a former Lake Ontario excursion boat, intended as a day cruiser. The ship had been laid up since 1924, following a serious collision in Toronto Harbour. Repaired and outfitted for service, the Modjeska arrived at Owen Sound late in the season, but with time enough to operate a few excursions, as well as two round trips to Sault Ste Marie. Over the following winter, the ship was equipped with cabins and staterooms to accommodate up to 150 passengers. Renamed SS Manitoulin, she began her first full season June 6, 1927, with Norman McKay serving as captain.

Norman McKay of Owen Sound was not working on the Great Lakes at the time the company was first incorporated in 1921, in 1918 he had accepted an appointment as captain of the SS Canora, which he delivered from Davie Shipbuilding in Quebec to British Columbia and operated it between Vancouver and Vancouver Island for its first few years before returning to Owen Sound.

=== Cruising the North Channel ===
The weekly schedule of the SS Manitoulin began with an 11:15 PM. Monday departure from Owen Sound, arriving Tuesday morning at Killarney, then through the North Channel, calling at Manitowaning, Little Current, Gore Bay, Meldrum Bay, Cockburn Island, Hilton Beach, Richards Landing, and Sault Ste. Marie, Ontario, arriving at Mackinac Island, on Wednesday evening. Returning over the same route with departure from Mackinac Island at 11 AM Thursday, the Manitoulin arrived at Owen Sound on Saturday morning at 4:30 AM. Weekend trips on the Manitoulin departed 11:15 PM Saturday, with calls at Killarney, Manitowaning and Little Current, followed by arrival back in Owen Sound at 4:30 AM Monday morning.

The SS Michipicoten continued on an unscheduled freight-only service between Owen Sound and Sault Ste. Marie, calling at Manitoulin Island and North Shore ports. The Michipicoten was destroyed by fire at the Cooks Dock, near Silverwater on Manitoulin Island, on October 11, 1927.

To replace the Michipicoten, the OSTC purchased the SS Macassa, then under the ownership of the Canada Steamship Lines subsidiary Richelieu and Ontario Navigation Company. The Macassa had completed her season on September 30, 1927, operating as a day excursion steamer between Toronto and Hamilton. The Macassa was originally part of the Toronto and Hamilton Steamboat Company, along with her sister ship, the SS Modjeska. Over the following winter in Toronto, she was converted for the accommodation of overnight passengers. Renamed SS Manasoo, she departed from Toronto for Owen Sound on April 16, 1928.

The 1928 OSTC schedule for the SS Manitoulin continued as it had the previous year, while the Manasoo departed Owen Sound on Thursdays at 11:15 PM. for a run that did not include Mackinac Island. After completing her northward voyage at Sault Ste Marie, the Manasoo returned to Owen Sound at 4:30 AM Tuesday mornings.

On September 15, 1928, the Manasoo foundered near Griffith Island in Georgian Bay. While fighting a heavy storm, she capsized when her cargo of 116 cattle apparently shifted to one side, overbalancing her. The recent addition of increased passenger accommodations on her upper deck is also thought to have contributed to her instability. She sank quickly. The bodies of her cattle are said to have stocked many a winter larder along the shores that year. All five of the survivors drifted for 60 hours in a life raft before being picked up by the Canadian Pacific Railway's SS Manitoba. A classic car was discovered inside the submerged shipwreck in November 2018.

=== Ferry service to Manitoulin Island ===
From the commencement of their operations, the SS Manitoulin (in 1927) and the SS Manasoo (in 1928) were capable of transporting automobiles. A competitor to the Owen Sound Transportation Company, the Dominion Transportation Company, also operated a pair of passenger and package freight vessels out of Owen Sound, over much the same route as the OSTC. In 1927 an automobile ferry, the SS Winona, provided service from Cutler to Gore Bay. Another automobile ferry serving Manitoulin Island was John Tackaberry's MS Alice, which sailed on a return route from Owen Sound, via Wiarton, Lion's Head, Tobermory to South Baymouth, and Providence Bay.

Throughout the 1927 season, Tackaberry operated the MS Alice on the run to Providence Bay. He was, however, unsatisfied with the performance of the ship. Anxious to dispose of her, Tackaberry sold the Alice to the Booth Fisheries Corporation of Canada Ltd. on April 3, 1928. Renamed MS Hibou to bring her in line with the other ships of the Dominion fleet (SS Caribou and SS Manitou -- "Hibou" being the French word for "owl"), she was operated for Booth by a subsidiary company, the Dominion Transportation Company Limited (DTC). She served Dominion's routes from Owen Sound to Manitoulin Island and the ports of Lake Huron's North Channel.

=== Tobermory–South Baymouth ferry service ===
In 1930, Captain R. Vittie and H.W. Harmer, of Southampton, Ontario, obtained a charter for the Georgian Bay and Manitoulin Transportation Company. They had purchased John Tackaberry's SS Henry Pedwell. The steamer was taken to Midland where it was widened and its gangway modified to accommodate automobiles. Later that summer the Henry Pedwell was placed in ferry service between Tobermory and South Baymouth.

With the 1930 season underway, OSTC purchased a retired Detroit Fire Department fire boat named the SS James R. Elliot, delivering it to the Midland Shipbuilding Company for conversion into a combination package freighter and passenger ferry. Replacing her boiler and steam engine with a new diesel engine increased her freight capacity and enabled her to transport automobiles. Overnight passenger cabins were also added. In 1931 the vessel was renamed the MS Normac, after the OSTC's general manager Norman McKay, captain of the SS Manitoulin.

The MS Normac began her scheduled route on July 16, 1931, taking the place formerly assigned to the SS Manasoo, leaving Owen Sound at 11:15 PM Thursdays and returning at 4:30 AM on the following Tuesday. Meanwhile, with the SS Manitoulin continuing her weekly Monday evening departures from Owen Sound, the OSTC also acquired the service of the Georgian Bay and Manitoulin Transportation Company and its steamer the SS Henry Pedwell, which they renamed SS Kagawong. The Kagawong was returned to the Tobermory - South Baymouth auto ferry route during the 1931 July to September season. During early and late seasons she operated on the Sault Ste. Marie route from Tuesday evening to Saturday morning, with weekend trips to Providence Bay.

From 1932 the summer-only ferry service between Tobermory and South Baymouth was assigned to the MS Normac, which sailed the route sturdily and steadfastly for the next 30 seasons. The owners of the SS Kagawong, Vittie and Harmer, defaulted on the mortgage held on the ship by its previous owner, and it was relinquished back to John Tackaberry. Dominion Transportation Company operated its MS Hibou between Owen Sound and Providence Bay until 1933, when it was assigned to other duties. John Tackaberry operated his SS Islet Prince over the same route, although this ship was better known as a Pelee Island ferry.

In 1936 the Owen Sound Transportation Company Limited and its competitor, the Owen Sound-based Dominion Transportation Company Limited, managed by R. V. Malloy, decided to merge their operations. Together the two companies, under the joint management of McKay and Malloy, operated a pool passenger-freight service to Georgian Bay and North Channel ports and continuing through the Soo Locks and into Lake Superior to Michipicoten, as well as the auto ferry service between Tobermory and South Baymouth.

The MS Hibou did not run much during the early spring of 1936; in June she was placed on the Tobermory ferry service. The previous year the Hibou had operated as a ferry and excursion boat out of Kingston where most of its staterooms on the promenade deck had been removed to make room for sightseers and dancing. With the loss of her cabins, the Hibou was best suited for day use such as the ferry route it shared with the MS Normac.

On November 16, 1936, the Hibou made her last run on the ferry crossing and returned to Owen Sound, from where it was to take a few more trips to Killarney and Manitoulin Island. It was dangerously late in the navigation season and the only ships of the pool service still in operation were the Hibou and Normac, SS Manitou, SA Caribou and SS Manitoulin having already gone into winter quarters at Owen Sound. Captain Norman McKay took command of the Hibou while her regular captain, James Agnew, moved back to the position of first officer.

On its second trip to Killarney on Saturday, November 21, the cargo on board Hibou shifted while she was operating in relatively calm waters, causing her to founder and sink only 10 minutes out of Owen Sound. It is thought that while testing the accuracy of a new compass, Captain McKay had made a sharp turn to the port side, causing the cargo to shift to starboard. The ship listed to starboard, and did not recover. In the ensuing tragedy, not only the Hibou, but seven of the 17-member crew, and Captain McKay himself, were lost.

=== New management ===
The pool agreement between the two navigation companies continued through the 1930s and into the 1940s. The SS Manitou served on the Tobermory ferry route from 1937 until 1941 when it was retired, being replaced by Dominion Transportation Company's SS Caribou. The SS Manitoulin carried on its regular scheduled route from Owen Sound along the "Turkey Trail" of the North Channel; but instead of terminating at Mackinac Island, she continued through the Soo Locks and proceeded to Gargatua Harbour, and Michipicoten.

The 1936 pool arrangement between the two companies had been suggested by Ivor Wagner, a director of Booth Fisheries Corporation in Chicago. Wagner purchased the Dominion Transportation Company Limited in 1937 and moved to Owen Sound the following year. In 1944 the outstanding shares of the Owen Sound Transportation Company Limited were acquired by Dominion Transportation Company.

Ivor Wagner had managed both firms since 1937, although absent from the area while he served overseas in the Canadian Army during World War II. He returned to Owen Sound in January 1945 to resume his responsibility as president and general manager of both companies. Other directors included W.W. Barnard of Owen Sound, employed by OSTC since 1927, who served as vice president and manager of operations. Mr. W.W. Barnard became president of the company at the beginning of 1969; W.A. Alexander, secretary-treasurer, who had been with Dominion Transportation Company since 1924; and William Owens, chief engineer, who had a lengthy connection with both firms, beginning with his association with the SS Manitou when the ship was constructed in 1903. Mr. Owens had been chief engineer of OSTC since 1926. The two concerns remained separate entities until the last DTC vessel, the SS Caribou, was sold at the end of the 1946 season.

In September 1946 a new ship, the SS Norisle—the name being derived from "North (Manitoulin) Island"—was put in service on the ferry route. Designed and built by the Collingwood Shipyards Limited for OSTC, the Norisle had a capacity of up to 50 automobiles and 250 passengers. Having more than twice the capacity of the SS Caribou and MS Normac combined, it was expected this new ship could handle the Tobermory - South Baymouth auto ferry route alone; however, because of an unanticipated increase in the volume of car traffic after the war, the Normac continued in service with the Norisle. Like her predecessors the Norisle was also equipped with staterooms for the accommodation of up to 100 passengers, enabling her to be used also on the Owen Sound - Sault Ste. Marie route during early and late navigation seasons.

The SS Manitoulin continued to navigate the Turkey Trail of the North Channel from Owen Sound until its honorable and well-deserved retirement in 1949. "Turkey Trail" was by then the affectionate term for the North Channel route, some say because a large number of turkeys were transported from Manitoulin's island ports along the north shore during the years immediately following World War II, and others because the ships serving the isolated ports of the North Channel wandered across the channel like turkeys. In 1950, the 60-year-old SS Manitoulin was replaced by the SS Norgoma—the name being derived from "North (District of) Algoma"—again designed and built by the Collingwood Shipyards Limited. Unlike the Norisle, the SS Norgoma was designed primarily as a package freighter and passenger steamship, specifically for the Georgian Bay and North Channel route—but, reflecting the practicality of its Grey County ownership, like its predecessors the Norgoma could also transport cars (if only a limited number of them).

The Norgoma operated on five-day (Owen Sound to Sault Ste Marie) and weekend (Owen Sound to Gore Bay) cruises, which remained very popular throughout the 1950s. However, the OSTC depended on its package freight trade to balance its books. By the early 1960s, that trade had largely dried up; the formerly isolated ports along the Turkey Trail were now served by roads and trucks. For some years, largely in order that their historic service could continue to the delight of tourists and Manitoulin Island communities and their leaders, OSTC was heavily subsidised by the Federal and Provincial governments.

The volume of car and passenger traffic on the Tobermory-South Baymouth run, however, continued to expand year by year. In 1962, Collingwood Shipyards converted the SS Norgoma to diesel-power, thus she became MS Norgoma, and in 1963 she began renewed life as a car and passenger ferry, sister-in-trade to the SS Norisle—and occasionally, at the beginning, to the old MS Normac.

=== Acquisition by the Government of Ontario ===
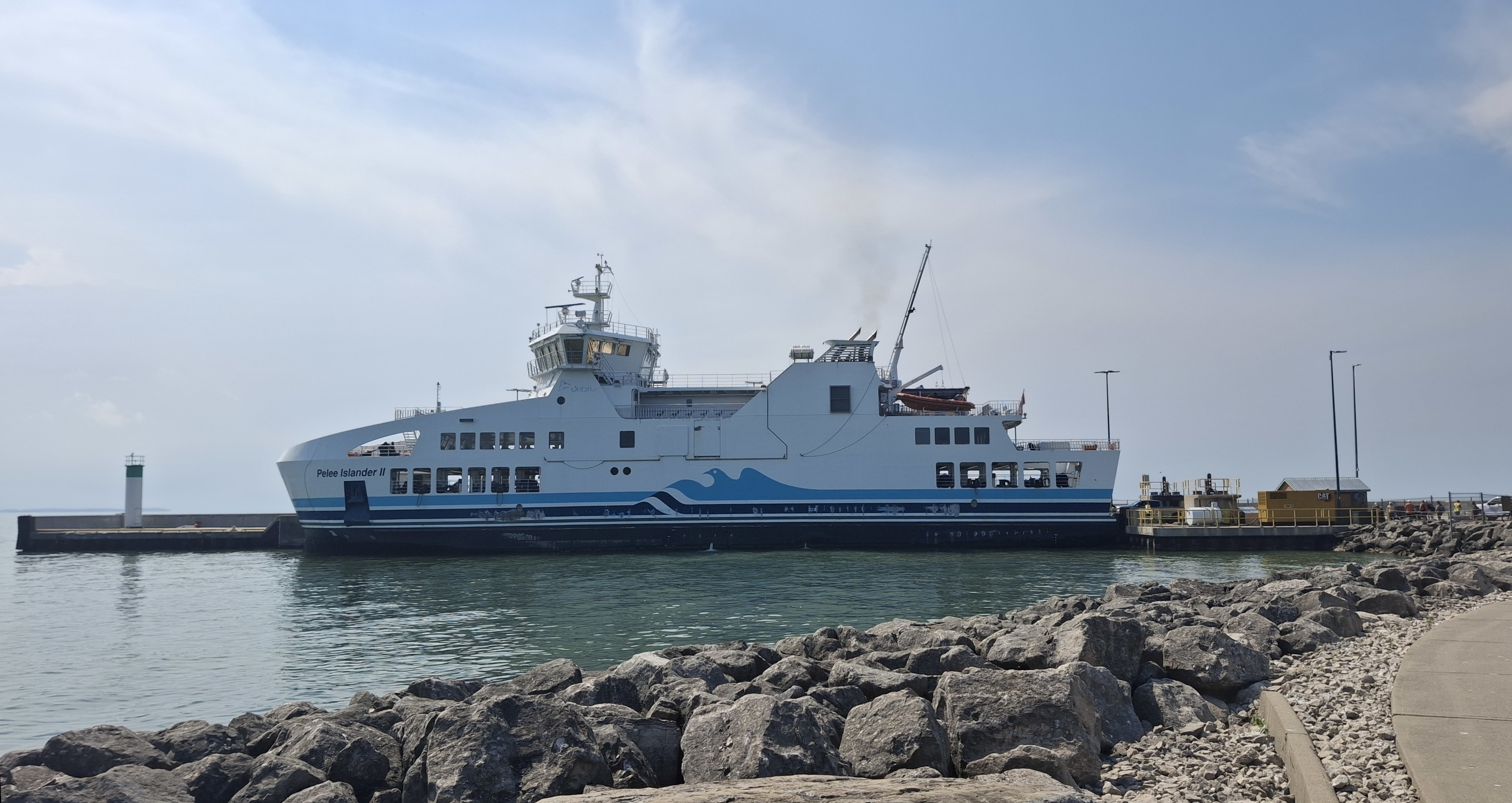
MV Pelee Islander II at Pelee Island Ferry Dock, August 2026.

In 1973, the Government of Ontario, through its Crown corporation, the Ontario Northland Transportation Commission, acquired the Owen Sound Transportation Company. This development resulted in the SS Norisle and MS Norgoma joining MS Normac in retirement; and a new vessel being commissioned, the MS Chi-Cheemaun. The MS Chi-Cheemaun—translating to "Big Canoe" in Ojibwe—was the largest vessel to ever operate on the route. At the time of her commissioning, she was one of Canada's newest state-of-the-art ferries, having been designed by British Columbia naval architects and built on Georgian Bay by the local Collingwood Shipyards as one of their last hulls.

In 1992, the agency was contracted by the Ministry of Transportation to manage and operate the Pelee Island Transportation Service, which provides ferry and air service between Pelee Island, mainland Ontario, and Ohio. In 2002, the Owen Sound Transportation Company was separated from the Ontario Northland Transportation Commission and was established as a Crown corporation under the direction of the Ministry of Energy, Northern Development and Mines.

Responsibility for the agency was transferred to the Ministry of Transportation in 2019.

In November 2026, the Crown divested itself of the agency, transferring it to Ontario Northland as a subsidiary.

== Operations ==
The Owen Sound Transportation Company is responsible for operating five ships, seven passenger terminals servicing the four routes operated by the company, and a seasonal air service. The air service is operated by a contracted operator between Windsor, Ontario and Pelee Island from late December to late March while the ferry service is not operating. The routes serving Pelee Island and the air service are operated under the contract to the Ministry of Transportation as the Pelee Island Transportation Service.

=== Routes ===
Routes operated by the Owen Sound Transportation Company
Terminus 1	Terminus 2	Months operational	Ships
Tobermory	South Baymouth	May–October	MS Chi-Cheemaun
Moosonee	Moose Factory Island	June–October	MV Niska I
Kingsville/Leamington	Pelee Island	April–December	MV Pelee Islander; MV Pelee Islander II
Pelee Island	Sandusky, Ohio	May–September	MV Pelee Islander

== Ships ==
Ships operated by the Owen Sound Transportation Company
Ship	Service years	Notes
SS Michipicoten	1921–1927	Burnt 1927.
SS Manitoulin	1926–1949	Retired 1949.
SS Manasoo	1928	Built 1888 as SS Macassa by William Hamilton Co in Glasgow; sank 1928.
MS Hibou	1920s–1936	Built in 1906 in Toronto and sold as quarantine vessel in Quebec, transferred to Owen Sound in 1920s and owned by Dominion Shipping (Transportation) Company; renamed Hibou and sank in 1936; salvaged in 1942 then repaired and sold to Honduras.
SS Kagawong	1930–1931	Built in 1909 as SS Charles Lemcke by Pedwell and Lembke in Lion's Head, Ontario and renamed Henry Pedwell 1912; rebuilt by John Tackaberry in 1916 in Owen Sound; renamed after machinery replaced in Midland, Ontario as Kagawong in 1930 and again renamed SS Eastnor 1933 before it sank and burned in Wiarton Harbour.
MS Normac	1931–1968	acquired from Detroit Fire Department in 1930; gutted by fire 2011 and now restored as Riverboat Mexican Grill.
S.S. Caribou	1936–1946	Owned by Dominion Transportation Co.; not to be mistaken for SS Caribou.
SS Manitou	1936–1942	Owned by Dominion Transportation Co.
SS Norisle	1946–1974	Retired 1974 and now displayed at Heritage Park in Manitowaning.
S.S. Norgoma	1950–1974	Dieselized 1964, retired 1974 and now museum ship in Sault Ste. Marie.
MV Pelee Islander	1960–present	Still operating as a part of the Pelee Island Transportation Service.
MS Chi-Cheemaun	1974–Present	Still operating.
MV Upper Canada	1977–2000	Leased to Beausoleil First Nation for service to Christian Island from 1996 to 2000. Abandoned in 2000.
MS Nindawayma	1989–1992	Sold and scrapped 2007–2012.
MV Jiimaan	1992–2019	Retired in 2019 after MV Pelee Islander II was put into service . Currently at the Cargill dock located in Sarnia, Ontario and listed for auction in 2026.
MV Niska I	2010–present	Still operating. Built by Chantier Naval Forillon in 2009 for ONTC operating seasonal runs from Moosonee to Moose Factory.
MV Pelee Islander II	2018-present	Still operating as a part of the Pelee Island Transportation Service. Commissioned to replace the MV Pelee Islander.
