= Big Tub Lighthouse =

Lighthouse near Tobermory, Ontario Canada

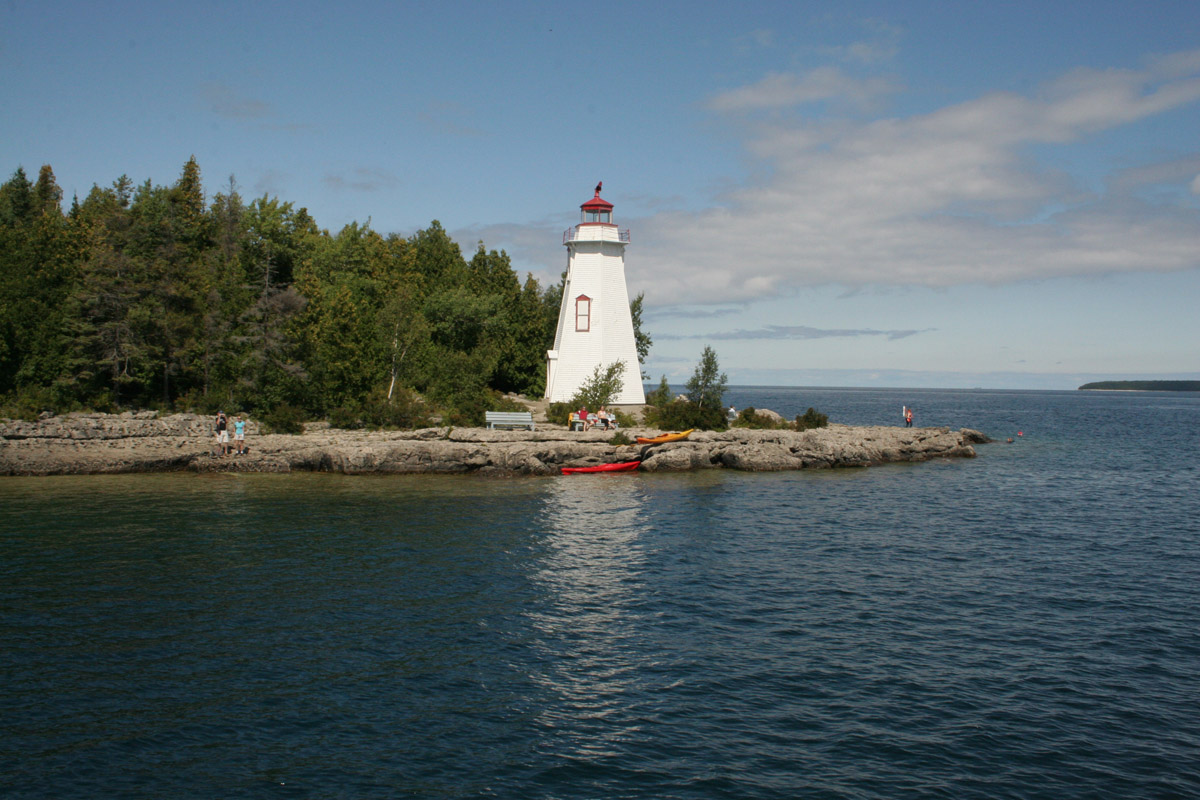
- Big Tub Lighthouse from the Tobermory Harbour
- Location: Northern Bruce Peninsula, Canada
- Coordinates: 45°15′27″N 81°40′22″W

Tower
- Constructed: 1885
- Construction: Wood
- Automated: 1952
- Height: 12 m (39 ft)
- Shape: Hexagon
- Markings: White with red accents
- Operator: Canadian Coast Guard
- Heritage: Recognized Federal Heritage Building

Light
- First lit: 1885
- Focal height: 13 m (43 ft)
- Range: 11 nmi (20 km; 13 mi)
- Characteristic: F R

Big Tub Lighthouse is an active lighthouse located near Tobermory in Bruce Peninsula, Ontario, Canada. The lighthouse was first lit in 1885 and remains in use today.

The lighthouse was originally built in 1885 when the Department of Marine bought the lots for the lighthouse and John George and David Currie constructed the lighthouse to prevent anymore ship accidents as the entrance to the Tobermory Harbour was hard to navigate and was often used as an asylum from bad weather. The lighthouse has a focal height of 13.2 metres (43 ft) and has a range of 11 nautical miles (20 km; 13 mi).

== History ==
The Commissioners of Public Works recommended a light be added to the area in 1857, but the light wasn't added until 1881. Charles Earl hung a lantern on a tree beach at night to provider safer access to the passageways that lead to the Tobermory Harbour. He started hanging displaying the light in 1881. He was allowed $100 per year for "keeping a light at Tobermoray Harbour.”

In 1885 the Department of Marine purchased three plots of land on the west entrance of the Tobermory Harbour at the cost of $18. That same year, John George and David Currie constructed a wooden tower at the price of $675 on the same port Charles Earl previously hung his lantern on the tree. The light was created 40 feet above the level of the lake's water. being visible 8 miles from all point of approach.

The tower was a hexagonal wooden building with a height of 43 feet. Abraham Davis became the keeper of the lighthouse in 1885, replacing Charles Earl (who was only in temporary charge of the light). Davis was the keeper for ten years until he disappeared in 1895. After his disappearance, Flora Davis (Abraham's widow) applied for the position, but Alex McNeill, Member of parliament recommended Henry Bradley Davis should fill his father's role, he was appointed by the Department of Marine to become the keeper.

Henry was dismissed from the job in 1901 when it was found he was absent as was hiring people to fulfill his duty. In 1903 the wage was increased from $150 to $250 and Archibald Currie was hired, but he still didn't remain on site. In 1905 a keeper's dwelling was erected near the lighthouse. In 1912 John Henry Smith got the position, and was actually present at the station. John resigned from the position after falling too ill to maintain the light. The final keeper was Thomas Andrew Hopkins who served from 1926 until the light was automated in 1952. In 1929 illuminating apparatus was upgraded from a seventh-order lens to a fourth-order lens.

In 1985 a pathway was created around the lighthouse. After a powerful storm in 1987, repairs were required for the lighthouse.

On April 30, 1992, Big Tub Lighthouse became a Recognized Federal Heritage Building for its good aesthetic qualities as a simply detailed, being well known to all mariners in the region and other reasons.

== Location and characteristics ==
The lighthouse is a wooden hexagonal building, painted white with red doors, windows and a red roof. The building is 12.5 metres (41 ft) tall. The lighthouse is located just off Highway 6 and is close to Tobermory. The lighthouse is surround by dark green bushes and cedar trees.

=== Usage ===
An automated red light at the top of the lighthouse is used as a guide for boaters during stormy and foggy weather, a nearby lighthouse at the Tobermory Ferry Terminal is used by larger ships such as the MS Chi-Cheemaun.

== Tourism ==
Due to the fact the lighthouse is so close to Tobermory and Ontario Highway 6's mainland terminus, the lighthouse has become a popular tourist destination.

=== Scuba diving ===
The waters near the lighthouse has become a spot for scuba diving and snorkeling for people from all over the world. There are many ship wrecks in the area, some of them being caused by the fog and navigation issues when accessing the harbour. The site offers an interesting wall dive with several crayfish in crevices in rocks.

== Keepers ==
This is a list of all the keepers of the lighthouse:

- Charles Earl (1881 – 1885) (Note: Not an official keeper; the lighthouse was created in 1885)
- Abraham Davis (1885 – 1895) (Note: First official keeper of the lighthouse)
- Henry Bradley Davis (1895 – 1901)
- Daniel Butchart (1901 – 1903)
- Archibald Currie (1903 – 1912),
- John Henry Smith (1912 – 1926)
- Thomas Andrew Hopkins (1926 – 1952)

== See also ==
- List of lighthouses in Ontario
- List of lighthouses in Canada
