= MS Norgoma =

Canadian ship

Coordinates: 46.508465°N 84.33569°W

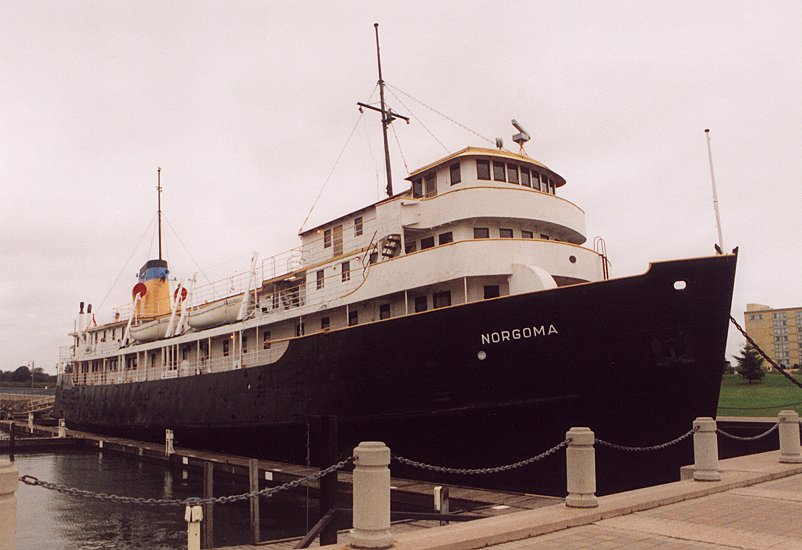
MS Norgoma at Sault Ste. Marie, Ontario

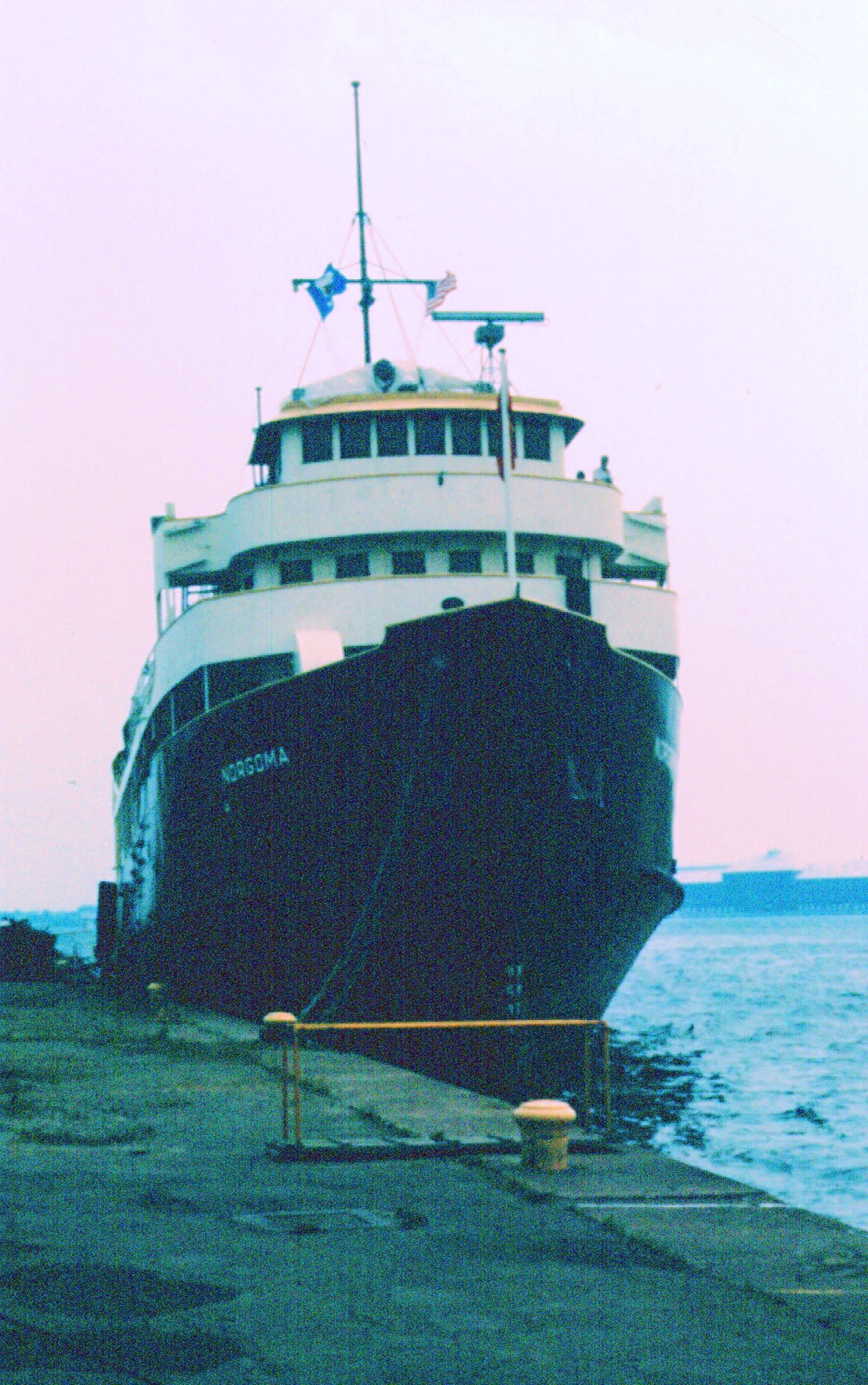
MS Norgoma in 1978.

MS Norgoma was a Canadian package freighter and passenger ferry, that could also transport automobiles on a limited basis. Originally constructed as a steam-powered ship in 1950, SS Norgoma primarily sailed the route from her home port of Owen Sound to Sault Ste. Marie, providing a five-day round trip, once a week, serving isolated communities along the north shore of Lake Huron. After conversion to a motor ship, Norgoma was transferred to the popular Manitoulin Island ferry route between Tobermory and South Baymouth along with her sister ship SS Norisle, replacing the smaller ferry, MS Normac, on that route.

Norgoma, owned by the Owen Sound Transportation Company, was built at the Collingwood shipyards in 1950. She replaced the SS Manitoulin, which was retired in 1949.

Norgoma travelled mainly on the North Channel route until 1963. Improvements to Ontario's highways, such as the Trans-Canada Highway (Georgian Bay Route) completed in 1962, brought about stiff competition for the company. In that year a 60-kilometre road was constructed to Killarney, the first port of call for the steamer. At the same, increased traffic on the Manitoulin Island – Tobermory route (Highway 68) demanded a greater automobile capacity than her sister ships SS Norisle and MS Normac could handle.

In 1963 the ship was refitted with a diesel engine to replace her original steam engine and boiler, to increase automobile capacity. As steam was still required to operate deck winches and the anchor windlass, a vapour steam generator, similar to those used on railway locomotives, was installed on the ship. MS Norgoma made her debut on the Tobermory run in 1964. According to Captain Schrieber, who captained Norgoma, it was the first vessel that he commanded where he witnessed livestock showing signs of seasickness.

In 1974, both Norgoma and Norisle were replaced by the much larger and more modern MS Chi-Cheemaun which could accommodate more vehicles than both sister ships put together. Norgoma was berthed as a museum ship in Sault Ste. Marie, Ontario. In 1981 the ship was transferred to a charity, the St. Mary's River Marine Heritage Centre.

In early 2019 Sault Ste. Marie City Council put pressure on the charity to move the Norgoma. The charity proposed moving the vessel to a mooring point at Roberta Bondar Park, where the tour boat Chief Shingwauk used to board tourists. However city officials pointed out the Norgoma was too large too moor at this dock, without jutting into the shipping channel, preventing visiting cruise vessels from mooring. On June 4, 2019, the Norgoma was moved to an alternate mooring site, on property previously owned by Algoma Steel, a site not open to the public. In September 2019, citing breach of the 1981 agreement, the City repossessed the ship and put her for sale.

A planned sale of the vessel to Dwor Metal company fell through in January 2023. The company's owner had planned to renovate the vessel for private use, but the transaction fell through. The vessel remains moored on the former Algoma Steel property as of January 2023.
