= CCGS C.P. Edwards =

History
- Name: Ottawa Mayhill
- Builder: Collingwood Shipbuilding, Collingwood, Ontario
- Launched: 26 October 1946
- Completed: March 1947
- Fate: Sold to Department of Transport

Canada
- Name: C.P. Edwards
- Namesake: Charles Peter Edwards, former Deputy Minister of the Department of Transport
- Operator: Department of Transport Marine Service; Canadian Coast Guard
- Acquired: 1947
- Commissioned: 1947
- Decommissioned: 1972
- Home port: CGS Base Parry Sound, Ontario
- Identification: IMO number: 5056468
- Fate: Sold to US interests in 1979

General characteristics
- Type: Lighthouse supply and buoy tender
- Tonnage: 338 GRT; 258 DWT
- Length: 144 ft (43.9 m)
- Beam: 27 ft (8.2 m)
- Draught: 10 ft (3.0 m)
- Propulsion: Triple expansion steam engine, 375 ihp (280 kW); 1 × screw
- Speed: 10 knots (19 km/h)

CCGS C.P. Edwards (Note: CCGS stands for Canadian Coast Guard Ship) was a Canadian Coast Guard ship. Entering into service as a coastal freighter in 1946 with the name Ottawa Mayhill, it was commissioned in 1947 as CGS C.P. Edwards for the Department of Transport's Marine Service, serving as a light vessel. (Note: CGS stands for Canadian Government Ship) C.P. Edwards was transferred into the newly created Canadian Coast Guard in 1962, and was decommissioned in 1972. The vessel was sold to private interests that year. An engine was acquired by Canadian Science and Technology Museum in 1976. The Canadian registry of the vessel was closed in 1979 and the ship was sold to U.S. interests.

== Description ==
Designed for coastal trade, C.P. Edwards had a tonnage of 338 gross register tons (GRT) and 258 tons deadweight (DWT). The ship was 144 feet (43.9 m) long with a beam of 27 feet (8.2 m) and a draught of 10 feet (3.0 m). The ship was powered by a triple expansion steam engine driving one screw, creating 375 indicated horsepower (280 kW). This gave the vessel a maximum speed of 10 knots (19 km/h). In

== Service history ==
The ship was ordered from Collingwood Shipbuilding as part of wartime construction and was built at their yard in Collingwood, Ontario. The vessel was laid down as Ottawa Mayhill and launched on 26 October 1946. The vessel was taken over during construction and was completed as a buoy tender in March 1947.

Named for the former Deputy Minister of the Department of Transport (1941–1948) and later Deputy Minister of Air Transport, Charles Peter Edwards, the ship was stationed at Parry Sound, Ontario until 1972 when the vessel was taken out of service. The ship was put up for sale and sold to Peter LePage Ltd in 1972, keeping the same name. In 1974, the ship was sold to E. Nieminen. Acquired by Kilbear Construction Company Limited in 1975 and sold later to Marine Transport & Engineering Ltd. in 1976. Its engine was acquired by the Canada Science and Technology Museum in 1976. The vessel's Canadian registry was closed on 19 September 1979 and it was sold to U.S. interests.

== Sources ==
- "Edwards, C.P." Historical Collection of the Great Lakes. Bowling Green State University.
- Maginley, Charles D. & Collin, Bernard (2001). The Ships of Canada's Marine Services. St. Catharines, Ontario: Vanwell Publishing Limited. ISBN 1-55125-070-5.
- "C.P.Edwards (5056468)". Miramar Ship Index.
