= Atlantic Superior =

- Atlantic Superior using her self-unloading boom in Brunswick, Georgia in 1984

History
- Name: Atlantic Superior
- Owner: Canada Steamship Lines
- Operator: Canada Steamship Lines; National Gypsum Company
- Builder: Collingwood Shipbuilding, Collingwood, Ontario
- Yard number: 222
- Launched: 9 November 1981
- Completed: 28 June 1982
- Identification: IMO number: 7927805; Callsign: C6AW3
- Fate: Broken up at Xinhui 8 March 2015 by Jiangmen Zhong Xin Shipbreaking

General characteristics
- Type: Self-unloading bulk carrier
- Tonnage: 24,638 GRT; 38,510 DWT
- Length: 222.5 m (730 ft 0 in) oa.; 216.9 m (711 ft 7 in) pp.
- Beam: 23.2 m (76 ft 1 in)
- Draught: 10.39 m (34 ft 1 in)
- Propulsion: 1 shaft, diesel engine
- Speed: 15 knots (28 km/h; 17 mph)
- Capacity: 38,771 m^{3} (1,369,200 cu ft)

Atlantic Superior was a self-unloading bulk carrier owned and operated by Canada Steamship Lines (CSL). The ship was constructed in 1981, launching in 1982 and was the first self-unloading vessel designed, for ocean service, built for CSL. In 1997 the vessel was operated on behalf of National Gypsum Company as M.H. Baker III. In 2003, the ship returned to her former name Atlantic Superior. She was sold for scrap and broken up at Xinhui by Jiangmen Zhong Xin Shipbreaking in 2015.

== Design and description ==
Atlantic Superior had a gross register tonnage of 24,638 tons and a deadweight tonnage of 38,510. The ship was 222.5 metres (730 ft 0 in) long overall and 216.9 metres (711 ft 7 in) between perpendiculars with a beam of 23.2 metres (76 ft 1 in). The ship was powered by a diesel engine driving one shaft. This gave Atlantic Superior a maximum speed of 15 knots (28 km/h; 17 mph). The ship had a draught of 10.39 metres (34 ft 1 in).

The ship had five holds and had a total capacity including hatches of 38,771 cubic metres (1,369,200 cu ft). The ship could discharge her contents via a 79.55-metre (261.0 ft) boom. The boom could elevate 19.96 metres (65.5 ft) from level and had a total height of 38.5 metres (126 ft). The boom could swing in a 180° arc and sat 35.4 metres (116 ft) from the stern of the ship. The discharge rate was 4,000 tonnes per hour for coal and 5,500 tonnes per hour for ores.

== Service history ==
Atlantic Superior was laid down by Collingwood Shipbuilding at Collingwood, Ontario and launched on 9 November 1981. The ship was completed on 28 June 1982. On 30 September 1982, in her first year of service, the vessel ran aground on Seven Isle Shoal in the lower reaches of the St. Lawrence River. She ran aground at 4 am in foggy conditions while en route to Quebec City. She was carrying a load of wheat from Thunder Bay, Ontario. 2,000 tons of wheat had to be removed before three tugs were able to free her from the shoal on 1 October 1982.

In 1994 CSL shifted the vessel to the Pacific Ocean. In 1997 the vessel was moved back to the Atlantic Ocean, was renamed M.H. Baker III, and started operating for the National Gypsum Company. CSL continued to own the vessel, and operated it on behalf of National Gypsum under a long-term contract. She was renamed Atlantic Superior in 2003, and CSL operated her on the Great Lakes for several years. CSL operated her largely on the Atlantic Ocean again, making occasional voyages to the Great Lakes.
