= MS Chi-Cheemaun =

Ferry in Ontario, Canada

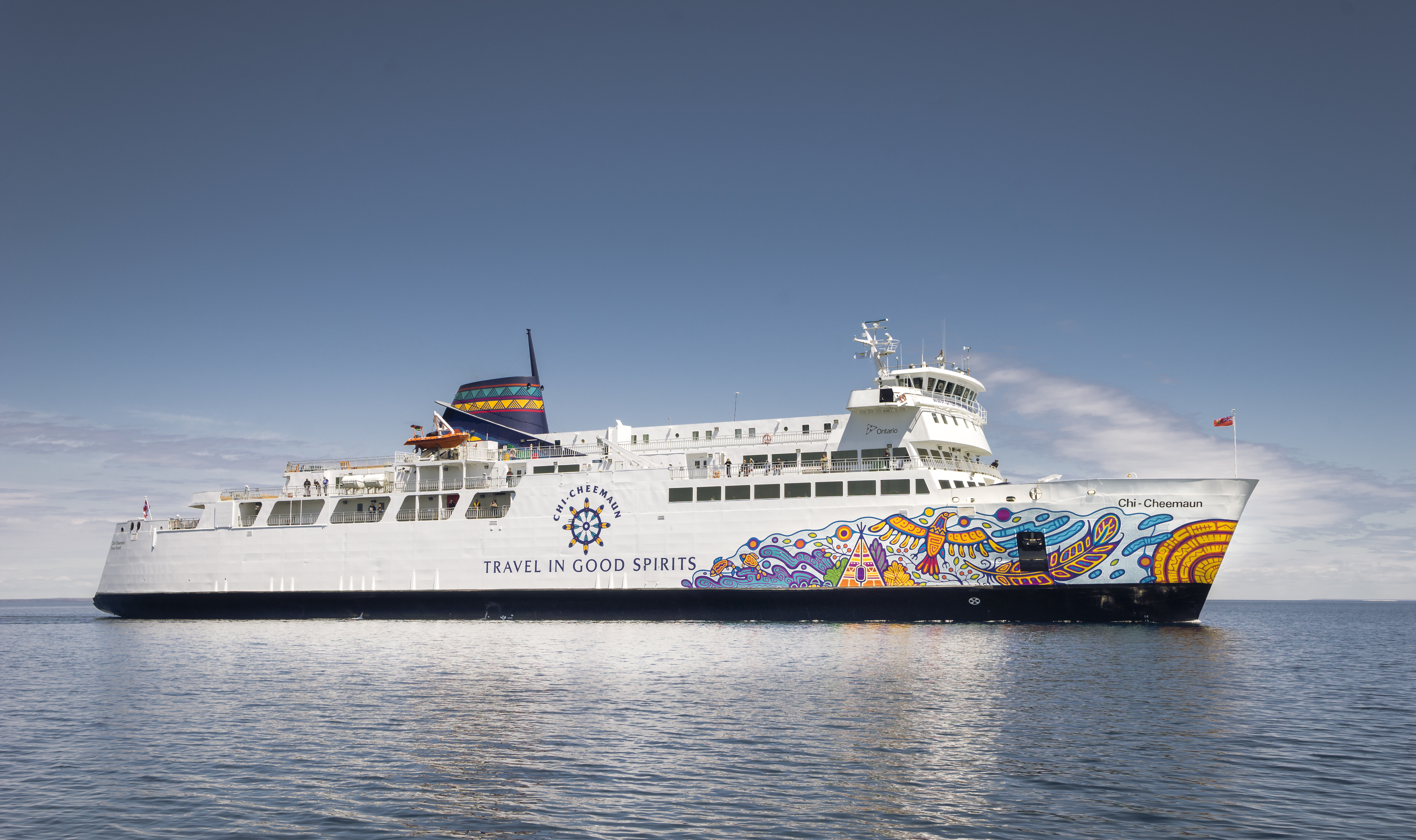

History

Canada
- Name: Chi-Cheemaun
- Owner: Owen Sound Transportation Company
- Operator: Owen Sound Transportation Company
- Port of registry: Owen Sound, Ontario
- Route: Tobermory, Bruce Peninsula → South Baymouth, Manitoulin Island
- Builder: Collingwood Shipbuilding
- Cost: CAD$10 million
- Yard number: 205
- Laid down: January 1974
- Maiden voyage: September 10, 1974
- Identification: Call sign: VGKK; IMO number: 7343607; MMSI no.: 316003125
- Status: Operational

General characteristics
- Tonnage: 6,990 GT; 482 NT
- Length: 111 m (364 ft 2 in)
- Beam: 19 m (62 ft 4 in)
- Draught: 3.53 m (11 ft 7 in) forward; 3.97 m (13 ft 0 in) aft
- Depth: 6.4 m (21 ft 0 in)
- Installed power: 3 × 900 kW (1,200 hp) Caterpillar 3508B main generators; 1 × 200 kW (270 hp) Caterpillar C9 emergency generator
- Propulsion: 4 × 2,320 hp (1,730 kW) Caterpillar C280-6 diesel main engines; 1 × 500 kW (670 hp) electric bow thruster
- Speed: 16.25 knots (30.10 km/h; 18.70 mph)
- Capacity: 638 passengers; 140 autos

MS Chi-Cheemaun is a Canadian passenger and vehicle ferry in Ontario, Canada, which traverses Lake Huron between Tobermory on the Bruce Peninsula and South Baymouth on Manitoulin Island. The ferry connects the two geographically separate portions of Highway 6 and is the vessel that replaced MS Norgoma and SS Norisle in 1974. The ferry service runs seasonally from mid-May to mid-October. As of 2022 she is the third largest passenger vessel sailing the Great Lakes after the expedition cruise liner Viking Octantis and the US ferry SS Badger, although several larger vessels previously serving the Great Lakes are still in service in other parts of the world.

Literally translated, "chi-cheemaun" (in folk orthography or chi-jiimaan in the more standard Fiero double vowel spelling) means "big canoe" in Ojibwe.

== History ==
A trip aboard Chi-Cheemaun is a longstanding Great Lakes tradition dating back to the 1930s when a small, wooden vessel, Kagawong, first ferried vehicles across the Georgian Bay between Tobermory and South Baymouth. It features a drive-on, drive-off bow and stern loading and unloading through a visored bow system and a square door stern section. The ship is 111 m (364 ft 2 in) long with a 19 m (62 ft 4 in) beam and has capacity for 648 passengers and 143 vehicles, including room for large highway vehicles such as buses and transport trucks.

Chi-Cheemaun was initially propelled by two Ruston 3,500-horsepower (2,600 kW) diesel engines and an 800 hp (600 kW) bow thruster engine for improved handling of the vessel at slow speeds. During the 2006–2007 winter layover period, her Ruston engines were replaced with four 2,320 hp (1,730 kW) Caterpillar C280-6 diesels. The bow thruster, previously driven by an independent 12-cylinder diesel engine, was replaced with a 500 kW (670 hp) electric motor. Along with modernization this necessitated an upgrade to 1,800 kW (2,400 hp) electrical generation, which was achieved via three Caterpillar 3508B/SR4B diesel generator sets.

The addition of two mezzanine decks in 1982 increased the ship's vehicle carrying capacity.

Like her predecessors on Lake Huron, Chi-Cheemaun is owned by the Owen Sound Transportation Company, an agency of the Ontario Ministry of Transportation (MTO)

Chi-Cheemaun makes the 40 km (25 mi) trip in about one hour and 45 minutes, three times each day during peak season and twice a day (with an extra trip Fridays) during May/June and September/October.

From 1989 to 1992, her sister ship, Nindawayma, ran the same route, but was retired because of service problems leading to public dissatisfaction and sat rusting in Owen Sound, Ontario. It was finally broken up in 2012 at Purvis Marine in Sault Ste. Marie, Ontario.

== Information radio ==
Two low power radio stations, CHEI-FM (89.9 FM in South Baymouth) and CHEE-FM (89.9 FM in Tobermory) broadcast tourist notices and schedule information for travellers on the ferry.

== See also ==
- Spirit of Ontario I, a ferry formerly operated on Lake Ontario
