= Assiginack =

- Township (single-tier)
- Township of Assiginack
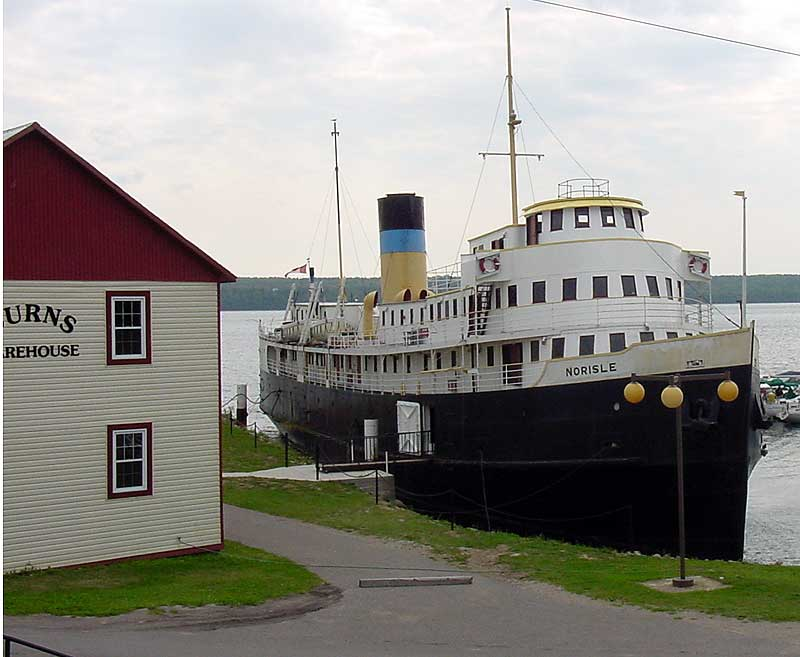
- The SS Norisle at the Manitowaning Heritage Complex

- Location within Manitoulin District Location within Ontario
- Coordinates: 45°44′N 81°48′W
- Country: Canada
- Province: Ontario
- District: Manitoulin
- Incorporated: 1871

Government
  - Type: Township
  - Mayor: Brenda Reid
  - MP: Jim Belanger (Conservative)
  - MPP: Bill Rosenberg (PC)

Area
  - Land: 224.89 km^{2} (86.83 sq mi)

Population (2021)
  - Total: 1,008
  - Density: 4.5/km^{2} (12/sq mi)
- Time zone: UTC-5 (EST)
  - Summer (DST): UTC-4 (EDT)
- Postal code FSA: P0P
- Area codes: 705, 249
- Website: www.assiginack.ca

Assiginack (/əˈsɪɡɪnæk/) is a township in the Canadian province of Ontario, located on Manitoulin Island. An Ontario Historical Plaque was built on the grounds of the Assiginack Museum by the province to commemorate the Manitoulin Treaties' role in Ontario's heritage.

The township is named after Jean-Baptiste Assiginack, an Odawa chief who supported the signing of the Manitoulin Treaty of 1862.

== Communities ==
The principal community in the township is Manitowaning. Smaller communities in the township include Bass Creek, Bidwell, Clover Valley, Eagles Nest, Hilly Grove, The Slash, Squirrel Town and Vanzant's Point.

=== Manitowaning ===
Manitowaning is the administrative centre of Assiginack township. The town was founded in 1836 as a centre of the island's Aboriginal education. Manitowaning Bay is a natural harbour, and the community has a marina with good docking facilities. From its early history, Manitowaning was a regular port of call for schooners and steamboats from many points on the Great Lakes. Manitowaning was the first and last scheduled stop on Manitoulin Island for the ships of the Owen Sound Transportation Company. The old steamboat wharf is now part of the community's Museum Heritage Complex, home of the SS Norisle. The town is home to the De-ba-jeh-mu-jig Creation Centre. Cardwell Street in Manitowaning continues east of the community, becoming the primary access road to the Wiikwemkoong Unceded Reserve.

== Demographics ==
In the 2021 Census of Population conducted by Statistics Canada, Assiginack had a population of 1,008 living in 447 of its 710 total private dwellings, a change of −0.5% from its 2016 population of 1,013. With a land area of 224.89 km^{2} (86.83 sq mi), it had a population density of 4.5/km^{2} (11.6/sq mi) in 2021.

Canada census – Assiginack community profile

	2021	2016	2011
Population	1,008 (-0.5% from 2016)	1,013 (+5.5% from 2011)	960 (+5.0% from 2006)
Land area	224.89 km^{2} (86.83 sq mi)	226.72 km^{2} (87.54 sq mi)	227.87 km^{2} (87.98 sq mi)
Population density	4.5/km^{2} (12/sq mi)	4.5/km^{2} (12/sq mi)	4.2/km^{2} (11/sq mi)
Median age	53.6 (M: 53.2, F: 54.0)	50.3 (M: 50.1, F: 50.5)
Private dwellings	710 (total) 447 (occupied)	730 (total)	707 (total)
Median household income	$73,500	$63,189

References: 2021 2016 2011

Historical census populations – Assiginack

Year	Pop.	±%
1881	881	—
1891	818	−7.2%
1901	839	+2.6%
1911	668	−20.4%
1921	614	−8.1%
1931	631	+2.8%
1941	760	+20.4%
1951	738	−2.9%

Year	Pop.	±%
1956	881	+19.4%
1961	805	−8.6%
1966	711	−11.7%
1971	757	+6.5%
1976	789	+4.2%
1981	851	+7.9%
1986	846	−0.6%
1991	917	+8.4%

Year	Pop.	±%
1996	926	+1.0%
2001	931	+0.5%
2006	914	−1.8%
2011	960	+5.0%
2016	1,013	+5.5%
2021	1,008	−0.5%

Source: Statistics Canada

== See also ==
- List of municipalities in Ontario
- List of townships in Ontario
