= Collingwood Shipbuilding =

Canadian shipbuilding company (1882–1986)

Coordinates: 44°30′15.2″N 80°13′4.7″W

Collingwood Dry Dock, Shipbuilding and Foundry Company
- Industry: Shipbuilding
- Founded: 1882
- Founder: J. D. Silcox and S. D. Andrews
- Defunct: 1986 (aged 104)
- Fate: Liquidation
- Successor: Canadian Shipbuilding and Engineering Limited
- Headquarters: Collingwood, Ontario, Canada
- Products: Lake freighters, Naval vessels

Collingwood Shipbuilding was a major Canadian shipbuilder of the late 19th and 20th centuries. The facility was located in the Great Lakes and saw its business peak during the Second World War. The shipyard primarily constructed lake freighters for service on the Great Lakes, but also constructed warships during the Second World War and government ships postwar. The shipyard was closed permanently in 1986 and the land was redeveloped into a new housing community.

== History ==
Formed in 1882 as Collingwood Dry Dock, Shipbuilding and Foundry Company in Collingwood, Ontario by J. D. Silcox (also contractor at the Murray Canal) and S. D. Andrews and renamed with the shortened name in 1892, Collingwood Shipbuilding's core business was building lake freighters, ships built to fit the narrow locks between the Great Lakes.

Over the company's lifetime it built over 200 ships. During the Second World War (1940–1944), the company was contracted to build 23 warships for the Royal Canadian Navy and Royal Navy, mostly corvettes and minesweepers.

The shipyard was acquired by Canada Steamship Lines (CSL) in 1945. Business slowed in the 1970s and by the 1980s orders were in severe decline. The shipyard closed following the merger of CSL's shipbuilding interest with Upper Lakes Shipping to form Canadian Shipbuilding and Engineering Limited in 1986. The last ship completed and launched by the shipyard was CCGS Sir Wilfrid Laurier for the Canadian Coast Guard. The company folded in 1986.

== The Shipyards waterfront community ==
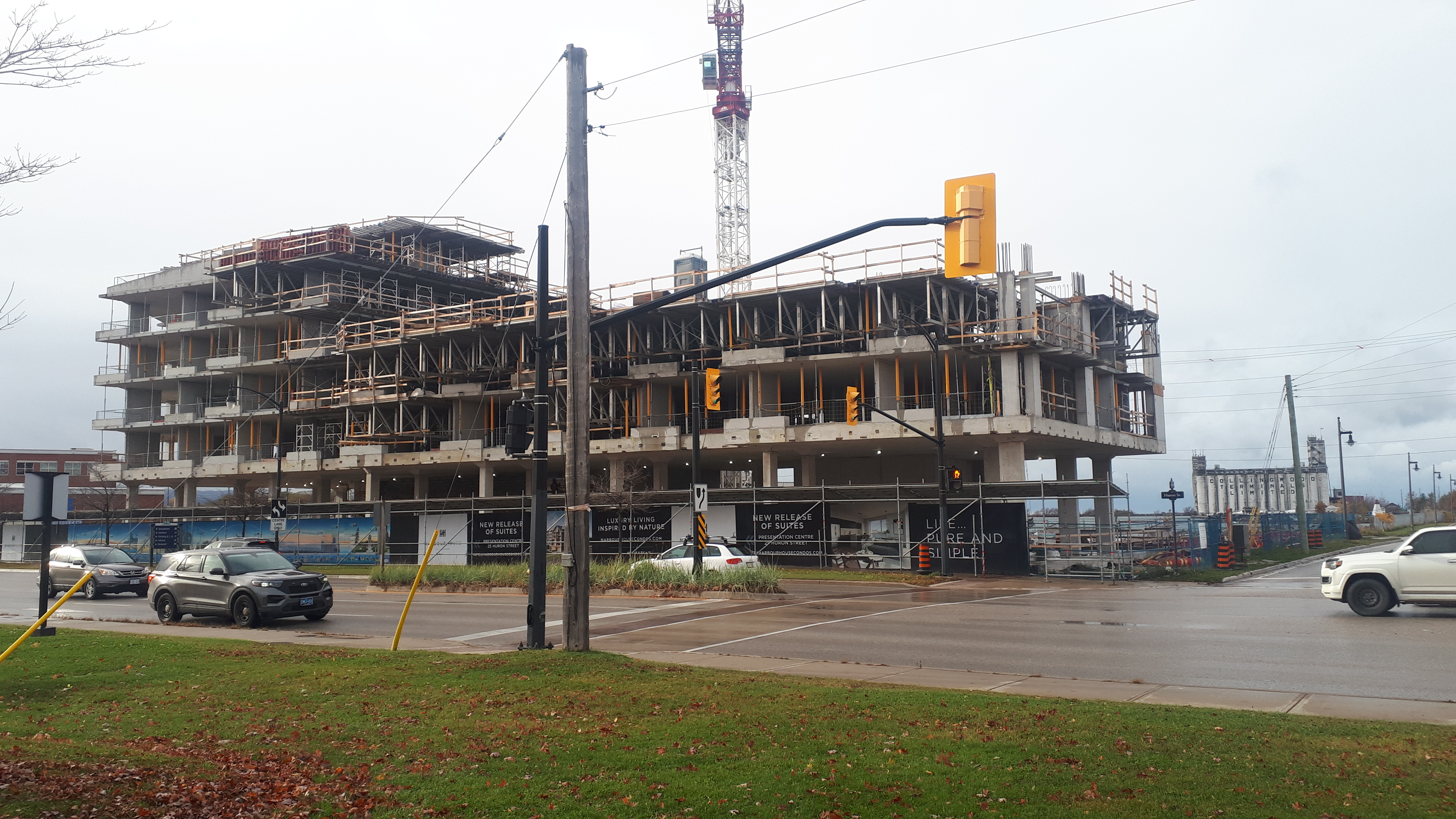
Condominium building under construction on Huron Street on the shipyards site in 2023

CSL retained ownership of the land and slowly the buildings and structures of the old shipyard were demolished by 2003. After remediation of 53 acres (21 ha) of the site was completed in 2003–2004, re-development began. Left vacant for almost two decades and then sold to developers Fram + Slokker. The area was renamed The Shipyards. Only the drydock basin and launch basin remain of the site's previous use and Buildings #1 and #2 were designed to pay homage to various shipyard buildings into the townhouse complex.

Beginning in 2004, the former shipyard was rezoned from industrial to commercial use. The property underwent re-development as part of Collingwood Harbour's revitalization plan. The area east of the former launch basin became home to a residential community consisting of low-rise condos, townhomes and detached homes. The former launch basin is surrounded by a boardwalk, while the area between the launch basin and the drydock is awaiting development.

== Other notable ships ==
- CCGS C.P. Edwards 1946 – buoy tender
- Isles-class trawler/minesweepers 1942
- Flower-class corvettes 1940–1941
- Park-class merchant ships 1942-1945
- CCGS Wilfrid Laurier 1985 – icebreaker
- SS Huronic 1901 - Great Lakes passenger ship/freighter
- SS Hamonic 1909 - Great Lakes passenger ship/freighter
- SS James Carruthers 1913 - Great Lakes freighter, sunk with all hands perishing during her maiden season, wreck located in 2025
- MS Chi-Cheemaun 1974 - car ferry
- SS Norisle 1946 - retired car ferry
- MS Norgoma 1950 - retired car ferry
- Atlantic Superior 1981 - retired bulk carrier
