= SS Manitoulin =

Several merchant ships have been named SS Manitoulin including:

- SS Manitoulin (1880), later Atlantic, Canadian package freighter, sank in 1903.
- SS Manitoulin (1889), originally named Modjeska, a Canadian excursion steamer launched in 1889, and scrapped in 1953.
