= Great Lakes =

Group of lakes in North America

Great Lakes of North America
- Great Lakes
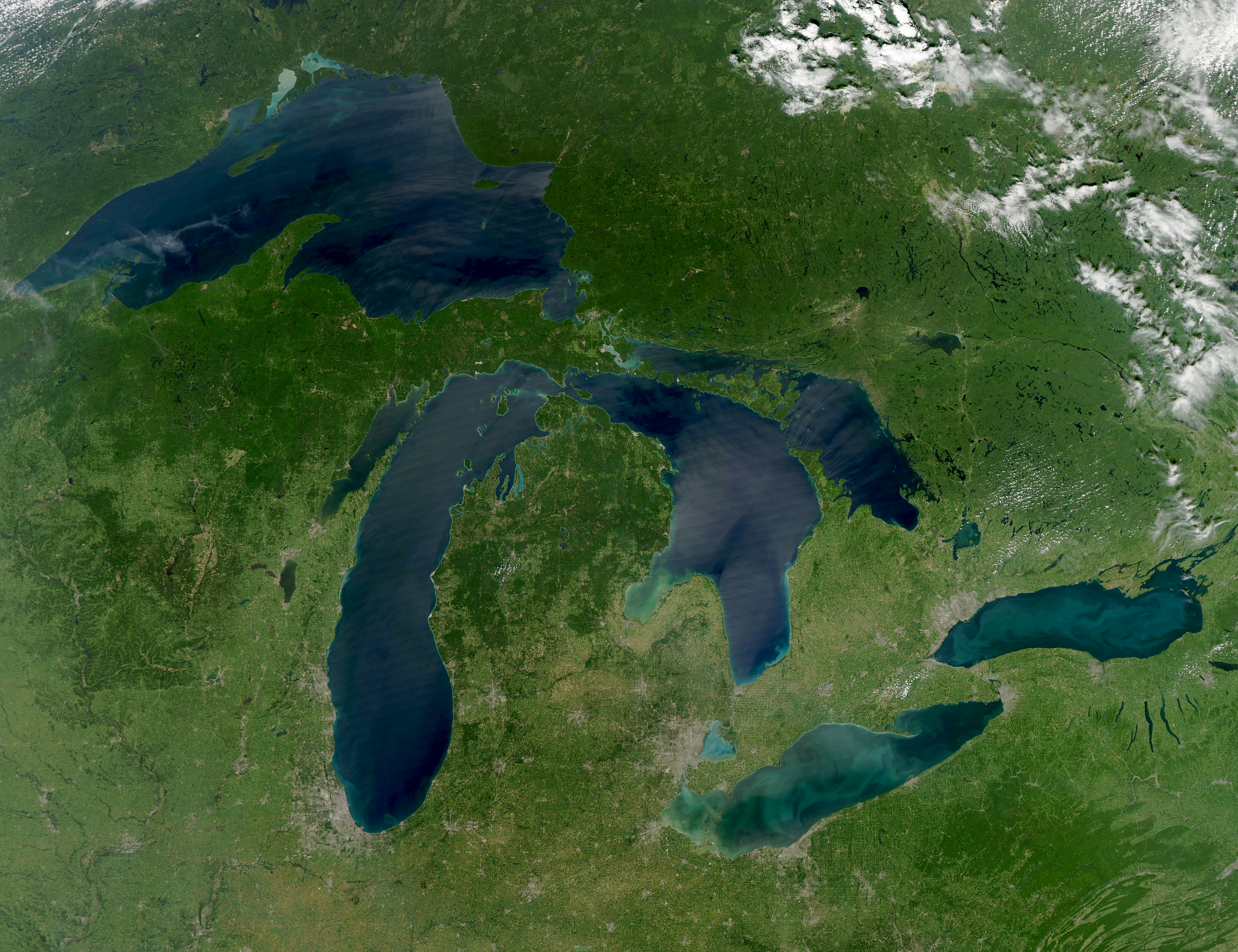
- The Great Lakes seen from NASA's Aqua satellite in August 2010. From left to right: Lake Superior, Michigan, Huron, Erie, Ontario
- Interactive map of Great Lakes of North America
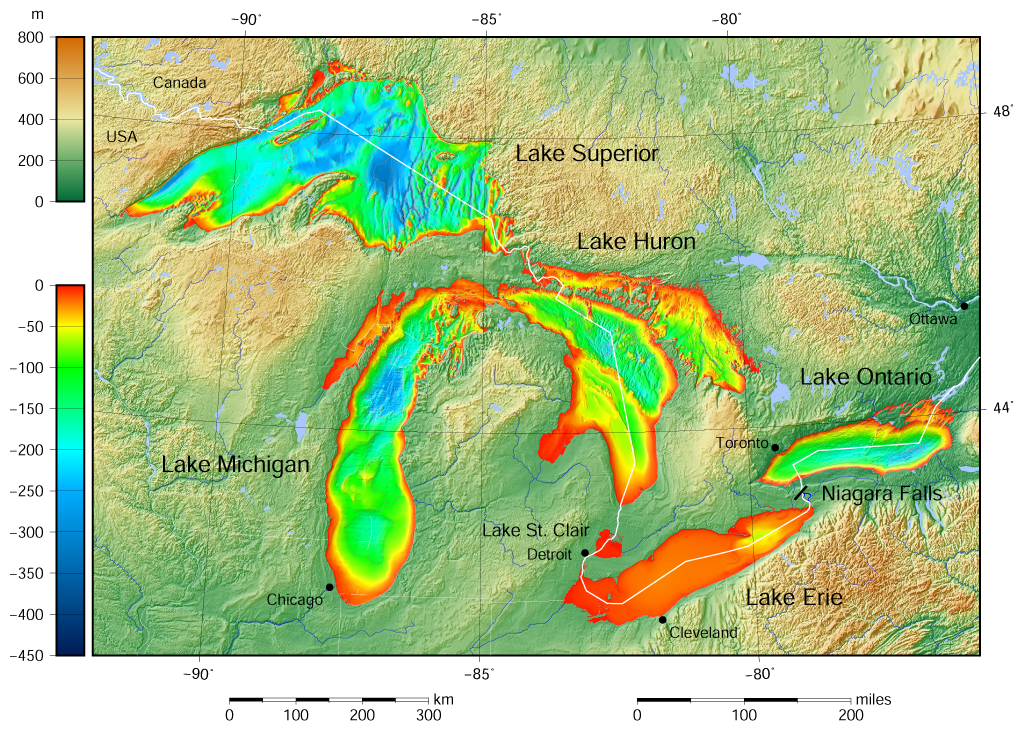
- Bathymetry map of the Great Lakes
- Location: Eastern North America
- Coordinates: 45°N 84°W
- Type: group of interconnected freshwater lakes
- Part of: Great Lakes Basin
- Primary inflows: Past: precipitation and meltwater Now: rivers, precipitation, and groundwater springs
- Primary outflows: Evaporation, St. Lawrence River to the Atlantic Ocean
- Basin countries: Canada, United States
- Surface area: 94,250 square miles (244,106 km^{2})
- Average depth: 60–480 ft (18–146 m) depending on the lakes
- Max. depth: 210–1,300 ft (64–396 m) depending on the lakes
- Water volume: 5,439 cubic miles (22,671 km^{3}) (lowest)
- Frozen: around January to March

The Great Lakes, also called the Great Lakes of North America, are a series of large interconnected freshwater lakes spanning the Canada–United States border. The five lakes are Superior, Michigan, Huron, Erie, and Ontario (though hydrologically, Michigan and Huron are a single body of water, joined at the Straits of Mackinac). The Great Lakes Waterway enables modern travel and shipping by water among the lakes. The lakes connect ultimately to the Atlantic Ocean via the Saint Lawrence River as their primary drainage outflow. The lakes are also connected to the Mississippi River basin through the Illinois Waterway.

The Great Lakes are the largest group of freshwater lakes on Earth by total area and the second-largest by total volume. They contain more than 20% of the world's surface fresh water by volume. The total surface is 94,250 square miles (244,106 km^{2}), and the total volume (measured at the low water datum) is 5,439 cubic miles (22,671 km^{3}), slightly less than the volume of Lake Baikal (5,666 cu mi or 23,615 km^{3}, 22–23% of the world's surface fresh water). Because of their sea-like characteristics, such as rolling waves, sustained winds, strong currents, great depths, and distant horizons, the five Great Lakes have long been called inland seas. Depending on how it is measured, by surface area, either Lake Superior or Lake Michigan–Huron is the second-largest lake in the world and the largest freshwater lake. Lake Michigan is the largest lake, by surface area, that is entirely within one country, the United States.

The Great Lakes began to form at the end of the Last Glacial Period around 14,000 years ago, as retreating ice sheets exposed the basins they had carved into the land, which then filled with meltwater. The lakes have been a major source for transportation, migration, trade, and fishing, serving as a habitat to many aquatic species in a region with much biodiversity. The surrounding region is called the Great Lakes region, which includes the Great Lakes megalopolis. Major cities within the region include, on the American side, from east to west, Rochester, Buffalo, Cleveland, Detroit, Chicago, Milwaukee, and Duluth; and, on the Canadian side, Toronto, Mississauga and Hamilton.

== Geography ==
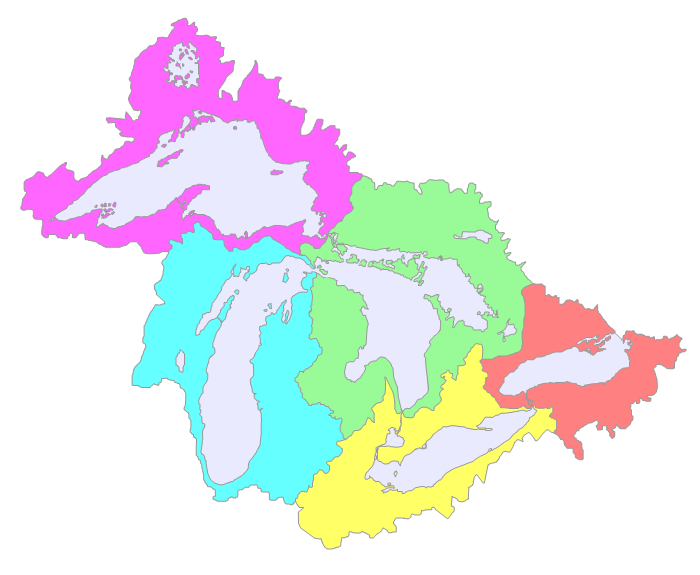
A map of the Great Lakes Basin showing the five sub-basins. Left to right they are: Superior (magenta); Michigan (cyan); Huron (green); Erie (yellow); Ontario (red).

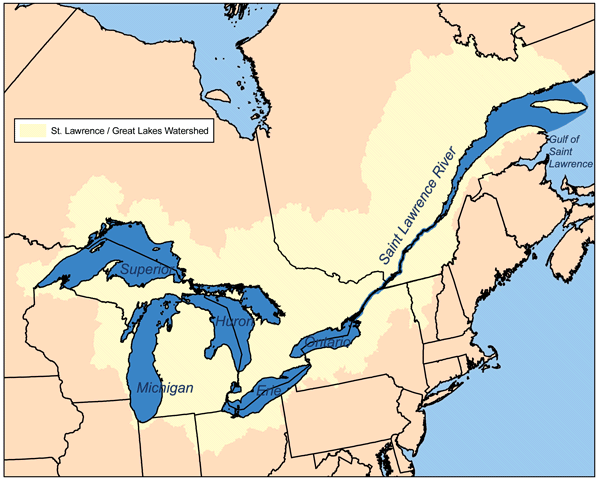
Great Lakes/St. Lawrence River watershed

Though the five lakes lie in separate basins, they form a single, naturally interconnected body of fresh water, within the Great Lakes Basin. As a chain of lakes and rivers, they connect the east-central interior of North America to the Atlantic Ocean. From the interior to the outlet at the Saint Lawrence River, water flows from Superior to Huron and Michigan, southward to Erie, and finally northward to Lake Ontario. The lakes drain a large watershed via many rivers and contain approximately 35,000 islands. There are also several thousand smaller lakes, often called "inland lakes", within the basin.

The surface area of the five primary lakes combined is roughly equal to the size of the United Kingdom, while the surface area of the entire basin (the lakes and the land they drain) is about the size of the United Kingdom and France combined. Lake Michigan is the only one of the Great Lakes that is entirely within the United States; the others form a water boundary between the United States and Canada. The lakes are divided among the jurisdictions of the Canadian province of Ontario and the U.S. states of Michigan, Wisconsin, Minnesota, Illinois, Indiana, Ohio, Pennsylvania, and New York. Both the province of Ontario and the state of Michigan include in their boundaries portions of four of the lakes. The province of Ontario does not border Lake Michigan, and the state of Michigan does not border Lake Ontario. New York and Wisconsin's jurisdictions extend into two lakes, and each of the remaining states into one of the lakes.

=== Bathymetry ===
Relative elevations, average depths, maximum depths, and volumes of the Great Lakes
Notes:	The area of each rectangle is proportional to the volume of each lake. All measurements at Low Water Datum.
Source:	United States Environmental Protection Agency

	Lake Erie	Lake Huron	Lake Michigan	Lake Ontario	Lake Superior
Surface area	9,910 square miles (25,667 km^{2})	23,000 square miles (59,570 km^{2})	22,300 square miles (57,757 km^{2})	7,340 square miles (19,011 km^{2})	31,700 square miles (82,103 km^{2})
Water volume	480 km^{3} (116 cu mi)	3,500 km^{3} (850 cu mi)	4,900 km^{3} (1,180 cu mi)	1,640 km^{3} (393 cu mi)	12,000 km^{3} (2,900 cu mi)
Elevation	174 m (571 ft)	176 m (577 ft)	176 m (577 ft)	75 m (246 ft)	182.9 m (600.0 ft)
Average depth	19 m (62 ft)	59 m (195 ft)	85 m (279 ft)	86 m (283 ft)	147 m (483 ft)
Maximum depth	64 m (210 ft)	228 m (748 ft)	282 m (925 ft)	245 m (804 ft)	406 m (1,333 ft)
Major settlements	Buffalo, NY; Erie, PA; Cleveland, OH; Detroit, MI; Lorain, OH; Toledo, OH; Sandusky, OH; Windsor, ON	Alpena, MI; Bay City, MI; Collingwood, ON; Owen Sound, ON; Port Huron, MI; Sarnia, ON	Chicago, IL; Waukegan, IL; Gary, IN; Green Bay, WI; Sheboygan, WI; Milwaukee, WI; Kenosha, WI; Racine, WI; Muskegon, MI; Traverse City, MI	Hamilton, ON; Kingston, ON; Mississauga, ON; Oshawa, ON; Rochester, NY; St. Catharines, ON; Toronto, ON	Duluth, MN; Marquette, MI; Sault Ste. Marie, MI; Sault Ste. Marie, ON; Superior, WI; Thunder Bay, ON

As the surfaces of Lakes Superior, Huron, Michigan, and Erie are all approximately the same elevation above sea level, while Lake Ontario is significantly lower, and because the Niagara Escarpment precludes all natural navigation, the four upper lakes are commonly called the "upper great lakes". This designation is not universal. Those living on the shore of Lake Superior often refer to all the other lakes as "the lower lakes", because they are farther south. Sailors of bulk freighters transferring cargoes from Lake Superior and northern Lake Michigan and Lake Huron to ports on Lake Erie or Ontario commonly refer to the latter as the lower lakes and Lakes Michigan, Huron, and Superior as the upper lakes. This corresponds to thinking of lakes Erie and Ontario as "down south" and the others as "up north". Vessels sailing north on Lake Michigan are considered "upbound" even though they are sailing toward its effluent current.

System profile of the Great Lakes

=== Primary connecting waterways ===
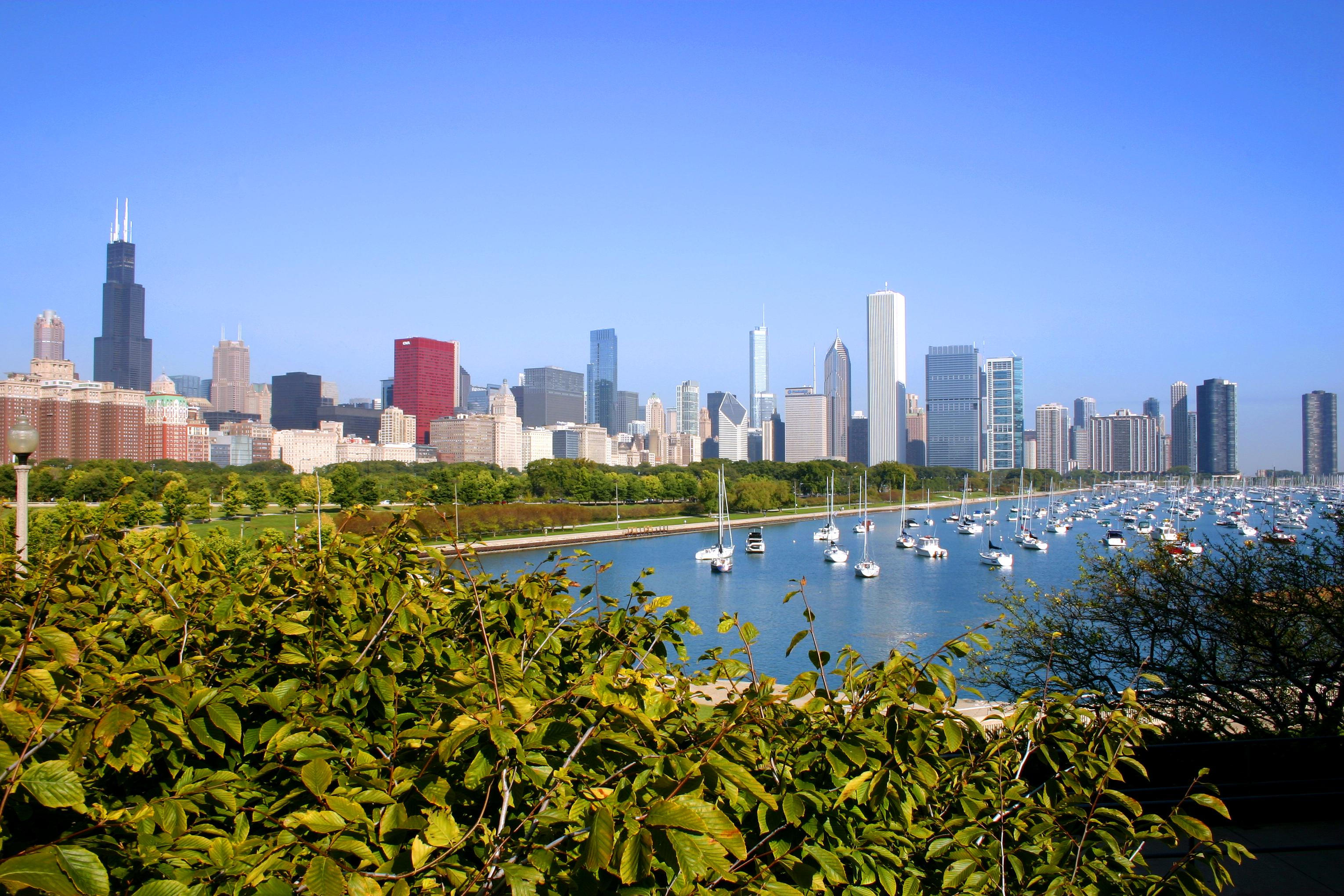
Chicago on Lake Michigan is in the western part of the lakes megalopolis and the site of the waterway linking the lakes to the Mississippi River valley

- The St. Marys River, including the Soo Locks, connects Lake Superior to Lake Huron, via the North Channel.
- The Straits of Mackinac connect Lake Michigan to Lake Huron (the two are hydrologically one lake).
- The St. Clair River connects Lake Huron to Lake St. Clair.
- The Detroit River connects Lake St. Clair to Lake Erie.
- The Niagara River, including Niagara Falls, connects Lake Erie to Lake Ontario.
- The Welland Canal, bypassing the Niagara River, connects Lake Erie to Lake Ontario.
- The Saint Lawrence River and the Saint Lawrence Seaway connect Lake Ontario to the Gulf of Saint Lawrence, which connects to the Atlantic Ocean.

=== Secondary connecting waterways ===
- The Chicago River and Calumet River systems connect the Great Lakes Basin to the Mississippi River System through human-made alterations and canals.

=== Lake Michigan–Huron ===
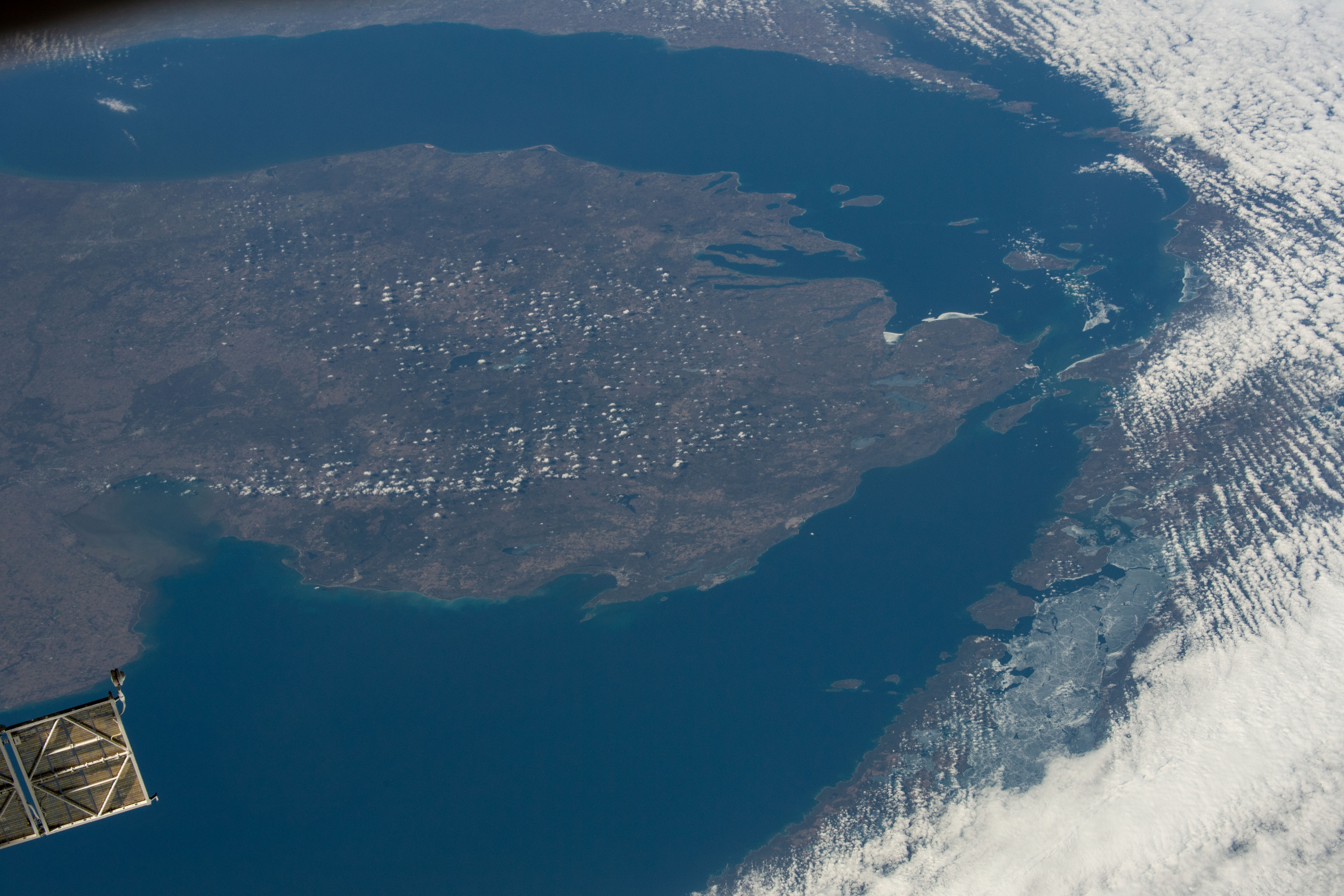
Lake Michigan–Huron with north oriented to the right; taken on April 14, 2022, during Expedition 67 of the International Space Station. Green Bay is at the upper right and Saginaw Bay is on the left.

Lakes Huron and Michigan are sometimes considered a single lake, called Lake Michigan–Huron, because they are one hydrological body of water connected by the Straits of Mackinac. The straits are five miles (8 km) wide and 120 feet (37 m) deep; the water levels rise and fall together and the flow between Michigan and Huron frequently reverses direction.

=== Large bays and related significant bodies of water ===
- Lake Nipigon, connected to Lake Superior by the Nipigon River, is surrounded by sill-like formations of mafic and ultramafic igneous rock hundreds of meters high. The lake lies in the Nipigon Embayment, a failed arm of the triple junction (centered beneath Lake Superior) in the Midcontinent Rift System event, estimated at 1.1 billion years ago.
- Thunder Bay (Ontario) is a large bay on the north shore of Lake Superior bordered to the east by the Sibley Peninsula in northern Ontario.
- Thunder Bay (Michigan) is a bay on the west side of Lake Huron in Michigan.
- Chequamegon Bay is an inlet of Lake Superior south of the Apostle Islands and the Bayfield Peninsula in northern Wisconsin.
- Keweenaw Bay is an arm of Lake Superior southeast of the Keweenaw Peninsula.
- Whitefish Bay is a large bay on the eastern end of Lake Superior which leads to the outflow of the lake into the St. Marys River.
- Lake Winnebago, connected to Green Bay by the Fox River, serves as part of the Fox–Wisconsin Waterway and is part of a larger system of lakes in Wisconsin known as the Winnebago Pool.
- Green Bay is an arm of Lake Michigan along the south coast of the Upper Peninsula of Michigan and the east coast of Wisconsin. It is separated from the rest of the lake by the Door Peninsula in Wisconsin, the Garden Peninsula in Michigan, and the chain of islands between them, all of which were formed by the Niagara Escarpment. The north end of Green Bay consists of Big Bay de Noc and Little Bay de Noc.
- Grand Traverse Bay is an arm of Lake Michigan on Michigan's west coast and is one of the largest natural harbors in the Great Lakes. The bay is divided into east and west arms by the Old Mission Peninsula. The bay has one major island, Power Island. Its name is derived from Jacques Marquette's crossing of the bay from Norwood to Northport which he called La Grande Traversee.
- Georgian Bay is an arm of Lake Huron, extending northeast from the lake entirely within Ontario. The bay, along with its narrow westerly extensions of the North Channel and Mississagi Strait, is separated from the rest of the lake by the Bruce Peninsula, Manitoulin Island, and Cockburn Island, all of which were formed by the Niagara Escarpment.
- Lake Nipissing, connected to Georgian Bay by the French River, contains two volcanic pipes, which are the Manitou Islands and Callander Bay. These pipes were formed by a violent, supersonic eruption of deep origin. The lake lies in the Ottawa-Bonnechere Graben, a Mesozoic rift valley that formed 175 million years ago.
- Lake Simcoe, connected to Georgian Bay by the Severn River, serves as part of the Trent–Severn Waterway, a canal route traversing Southern Ontario between Lakes Ontario and Huron.
- Saginaw Bay, an extension of Lake Huron into the Lower Peninsula of Michigan, fed by the Saginaw and other rivers, has the largest contiguous freshwater wetland in the United States.
- Lake St. Clair, connected with Lake Huron to its north by the St. Clair River and with Lake Erie to its south by the Detroit River. Although it is 17 times smaller in area than Lake Ontario and only rarely included in the listings of the Great Lakes, proposals for its official recognition as a Great Lake are occasionally made, which would affect its inclusion in scientific research projects designated as related to "The Great Lakes".
- Sandusky Bay is a bay on Lake Erie in northern Ohio.
- Long Point Bay is a bay on the north shore of Lake Erie in Ontario.
- Hamilton Harbour is a harbor on the western tip of Lake Ontario.
- The Bay of Quinte is a long and narrow bay on the north shore of Lake Ontario.

=== Islands ===
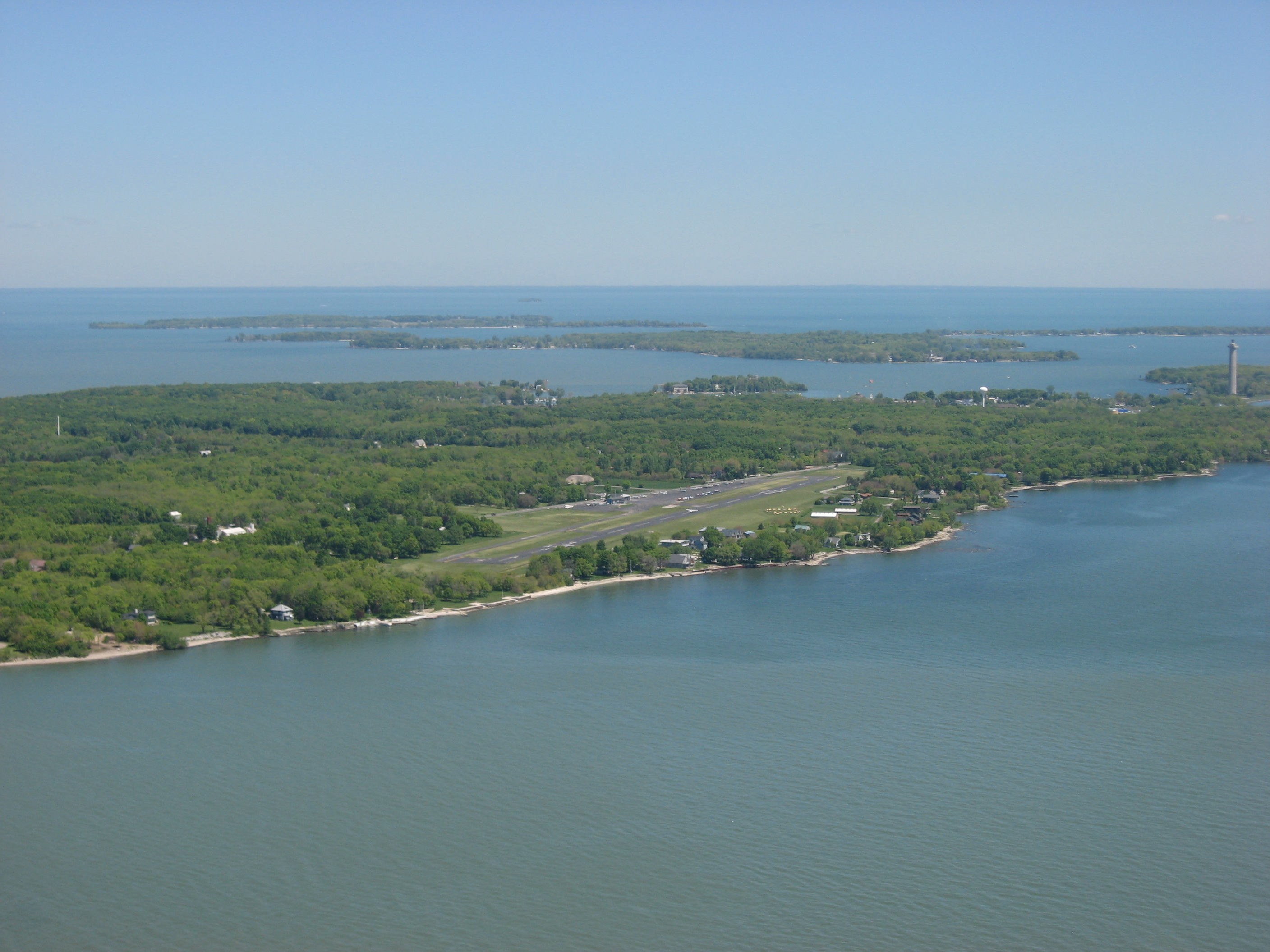
South Bass Island in Lake Erie

Dispersed throughout the Great Lakes are approximately 35,000 islands. The largest among them is Manitoulin Island in Lake Huron, the largest island in any inland body of water in the world. The second-largest island is Isle Royale in Lake Superior. Both of these islands are large enough to contain multiple lakes themselves—for instance, Manitoulin Island's Lake Manitou is the world's largest lake on a freshwater island. Some of these lakes even have their own islands, like Treasure Island in Lake Mindemoya in Manitoulin Island.

=== Peninsulas ===
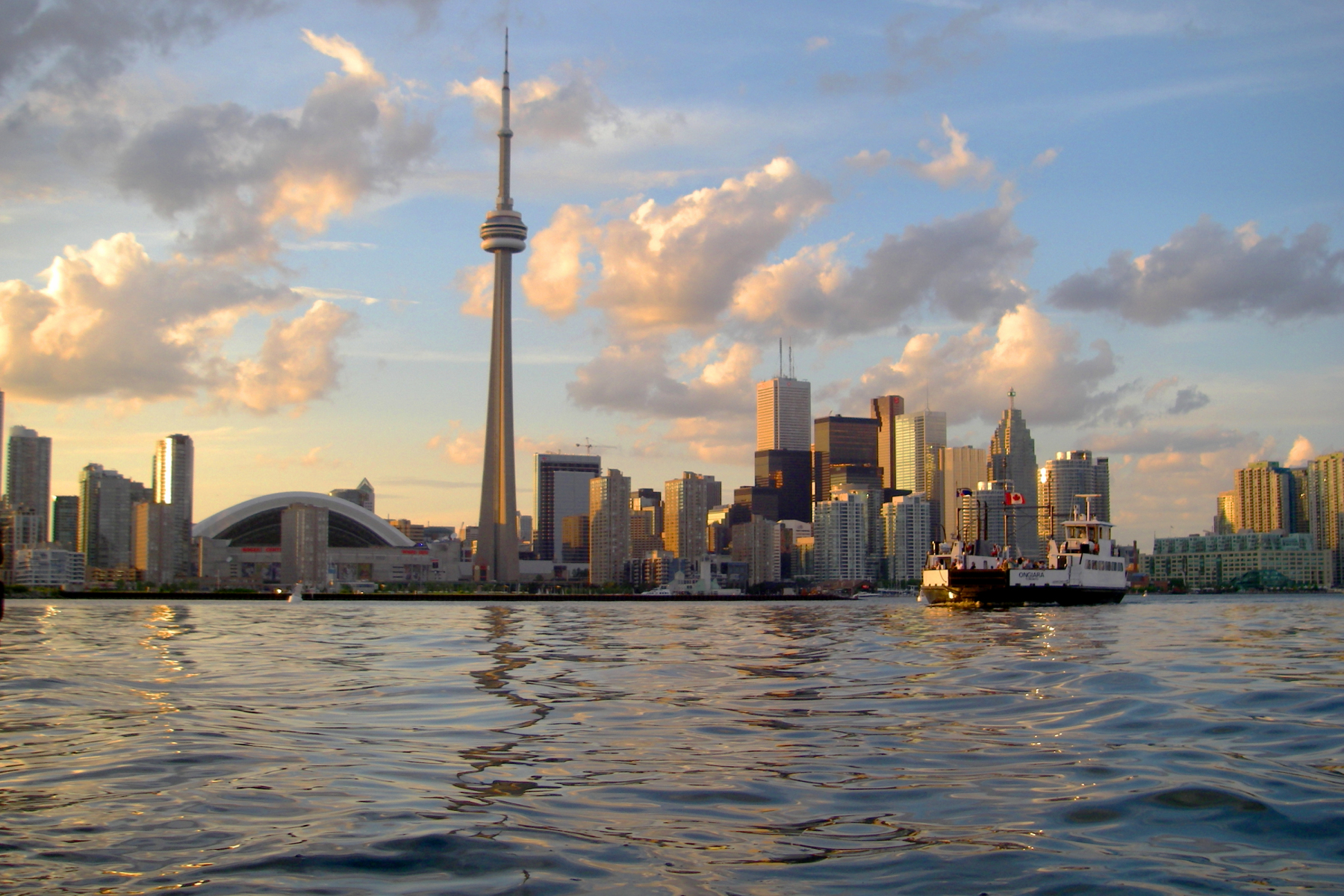
Toronto on Lake Ontario is in the eastern section of the Great Lakes Megalopolis

The Great Lakes have several peninsulas between them, most prominently the Upper Peninsula, the Lower Peninsula, and the Ontario Peninsula. Population centers on these peninsulas include Grand Rapids, Flint, and Detroit in Michigan along with London, Hamilton, Brantford, and Toronto in Ontario. Other significant peninsulas in the Great Lakes include the Sibley, Bayfield, Keweenaw, Door, Garden, Leelanau, Thumb, Bruce, and Niagara peninsulas.

=== Shipping connection to the ocean ===
Although the Saint Lawrence Seaway and Great Lakes Waterway make the Great Lakes accessible to ocean-going vessels, shifts in shipping to wider ocean-going container ships—which do not fit through the locks on these routes—have limited container shipping on the lakes. Most Great Lakes trade is of bulk material, and bulk freighters of Seawaymax-size or less can move throughout the entire lakes and out to the Atlantic. Larger ships are confined to working within the lakes. Only barges can access the Illinois Waterway system providing access to the Gulf of Mexico via the Mississippi River. Despite their vast size, large sections of the Great Lakes freeze over in winter, interrupting most shipping from January to March. Some icebreakers ply the lakes, keeping the shipping lanes open through other periods of ice on the lakes.

The Great Lakes are connected by the Chicago Sanitary and Ship Canal to the Gulf of Mexico via the Illinois River (from the Chicago River) and the Mississippi River. An alternate track is via the Illinois River (from Chicago), to the Mississippi, up the Ohio, and then through the Tennessee–Tombigbee Waterway (a combination of a series of rivers and lakes and canals), to Mobile Bay and the Gulf of Mexico. Commercial tug-and-barge traffic on these waterways is heavy.

Pleasure boats can enter or exit the Great Lakes by way of the Erie Canal and Hudson River in New York. The Erie Canal connects to the Great Lakes at the east end of Lake Erie (at Buffalo, New York) and at the south side of Lake Ontario (at Oswego, New York).

=== Water levels ===
The lakes were originally fed by both precipitation and meltwater from glaciers which are no longer present. In modern times, only about 1% of volume per year is "new" water, originating from rivers, precipitation, and groundwater springs. In the post-glacial period, evaporation, and drainage have generally been balanced, making the levels of the lakes relatively constant.

Intensive human population growth began in the region in the 20th century and continues today. At least two human water use activities have been identified as having the potential to affect the lakes' levels: diversion (the transfer of water to other watersheds) and consumption (substantially done today by the use of lake water to power and cool electric generation plants, resulting in evaporation). Outflows through the Chicago Sanitary and Ship Canal is more than balanced by artificial inflows via the Ogoki River and Long Lake/Kenogami River diversions. Fluctuation of the water levels in the lakes has been observed since records began in 1918. The water level of Lake Michigan–Huron had remained fairly constant over the 20th century. Recent lake levels include record low levels in 2013 in Lakes Superior, Erie, and Michigan-Huron, followed by record high levels in 2020 in the same lakes. The water level in Lake Ontario has remained relatively constant in the same time period, hovering around the historical average level.

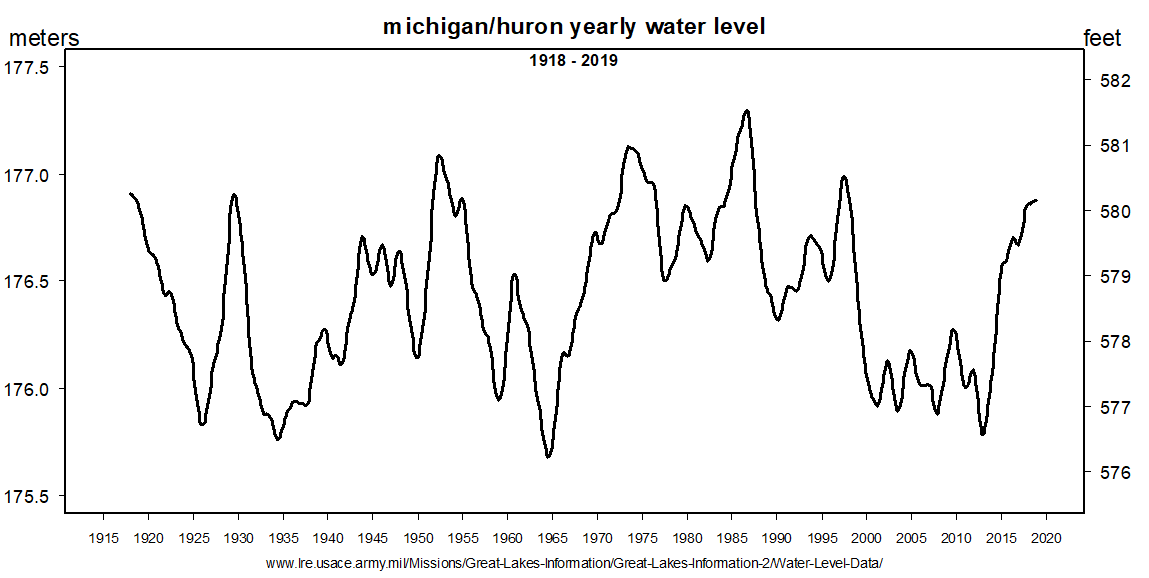
Water levels of Lakes Michigan and Huron in the United States, 1918 to 2019

Although "true tides—changes in water level caused by the gravitational forces of the sun and moon—do occur in a semi-diurnal (twice daily) pattern", such changes are quite small and generally obscured by other forces. The lake levels are affected primarily by changes in regional meteorology and climatology. The outflows from Lakes Superior and Ontario are regulated, while the outflows of Michigan-Huron and Erie are not regulated at all. Ontario is the most tightly regulated, with its outflow controlled by the Moses-Saunders Power Dam, which explains its consistent historical levels.

=== Ice cover ===
The annual ice coverage on the Great Lakes varies greatly from year to year due to weather patterns and long-term climate trends. Ice typically begins forming in December and reaches its peak in February or early March. The extent of ice cover can vary from as little as 10% to over 90% depending on winter severity. For example, during the particularly cold winter of 2013–2014, ice coverage peaked at over 92% across the five lakes, while in milder years like 2023–2024, coverage remained below 20%. Long-term data from the National Oceanic and Atmospheric Administration's Great Lakes Environmental Research Laboratory (NOAA GLERL) indicate a general decline in maximum ice cover over the past few decades, aligning with broader patterns of warming in the region.

== Etymology ==
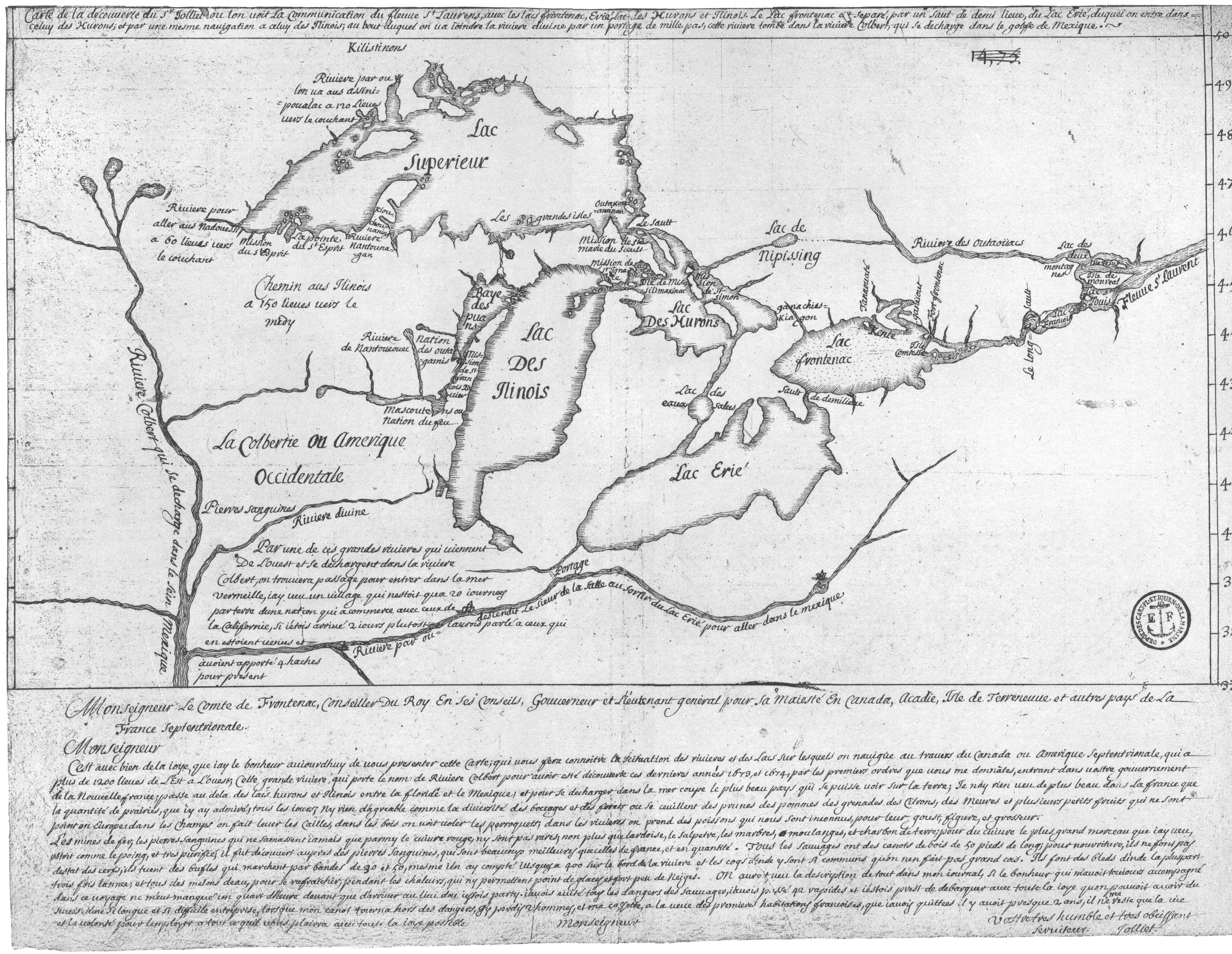
1675 French map, published shortly before the voyage of Le Griffon. Lake Michigan is named Lake Illinois (the name change is first recorded in 1681), and Lake Ontario is named Lake Frontenac, after the then-governor of New France.

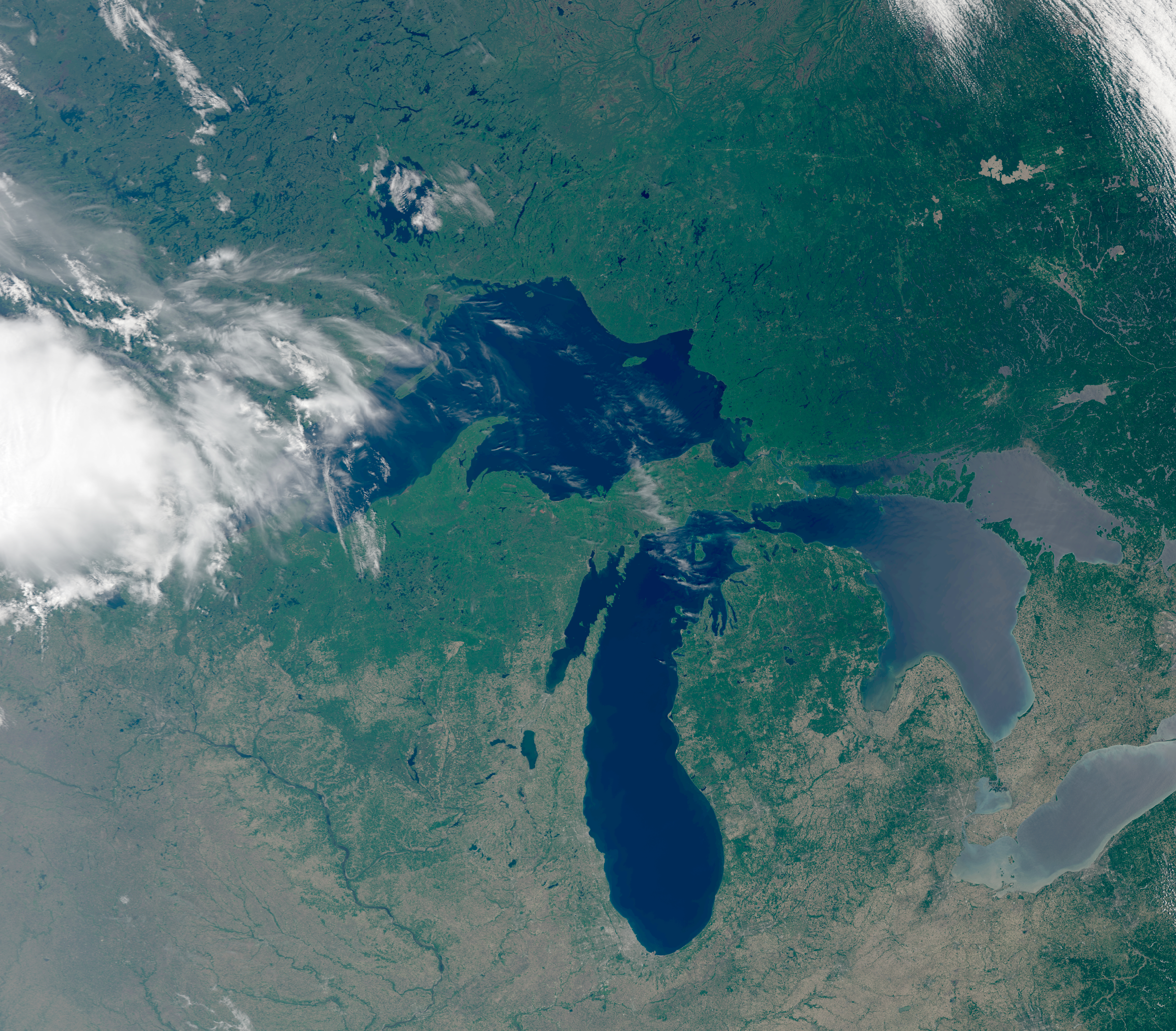
Lakes Superior, Michigan, Huron, and Erie, photographed from the Sentinel-3B satellite in June 2022, Lake Ontario is not visible in this image.

Lake Erie
From the Erie tribe, a shortened form of the Iroquoian word erielhonan 'long tail'.
Lake Huron
Named for the inhabitants of the area, the Wendat (or "Hurons"), by the first French explorers . The Wendat originally referred to the lake by the name karegnondi, a word which has been variously translated as "Freshwater Sea", "Lake of the Hurons", or simply "lake".
Lake Michigan
From the Ojibwe word mishi-gami "great water" or "large lake".
Lake Ontario
From the Wendat word ontarí'io "lake of shining waters".
Lake Superior
English translation of the French term lac supérieur "upper lake", referring to its position higher in elevation than (and therefore draining into) Lake Huron. The indigenous Ojibwe call it gichi-gami (from Ojibwe gichi "big, large, great"; gami "water, lake, sea"). Popularized in French-influenced transliteration as Gitchigumi as in Gordon Lightfoot's 1976 story song "The Wreck of the Edmund Fitzgerald", or Gitchee Gumee as in Henry Wadsworth Longfellow's 1855 epic poem, The Song of Hiawatha).

== Statistics ==
The Great Lakes contain 21% of the world's surface fresh water: 5,472 cubic miles (22,810 km^{3}), or 6.0×10^{15} U.S. gallons, that is 6 quadrillion U.S. gallons, (2.3×10^{16} liters). The lakes contain about 84% of the surface freshwater of North America; if the water were evenly distributed over the entire continent's land area, it would reach a depth of 5 feet (1.5 meters). This is enough water to cover the 48 contiguous U.S. states to a uniform depth of 9.5 feet (2.9 m). Although the lakes contain a large percentage of the world's fresh water, the Great Lakes supply only a small portion of U.S. drinking water on a national basis.

The total surface area of the lakes is approximately 94,250 square miles (244,100 km^{2})—nearly the same size as the United Kingdom, and larger than the U.S. states of New York, New Jersey, Connecticut, Rhode Island, Massachusetts, Vermont, and New Hampshire combined. The Great Lakes coast measures approximately 10,500 miles (16,900 km). Canada borders approximately 5,200 miles (8,400 km) of coastline, while the remaining 5,300 miles (8,500 km) are bordered by the United States. Michigan has the longest shoreline of the United States, bordering roughly 3,288 miles (5,292 km) of lakes, followed by Wisconsin (820 miles (1,320 km)), New York (473 miles (761 km)), and Ohio (312 miles (502 km)). Traversing the shoreline of all the lakes would cover a distance roughly equivalent to travelling half-way around the world at the equator.

A notable modern phenomenon is the formation of ice volcanoes over the lakes during wintertime. Storm-generated waves carve the lakes' ice sheet and create conical mounds through the eruption of water and slush. The process is only well-documented in the Great Lakes, and has been credited with sparing the southern shorelines from worse rocky erosion.

== Geology ==
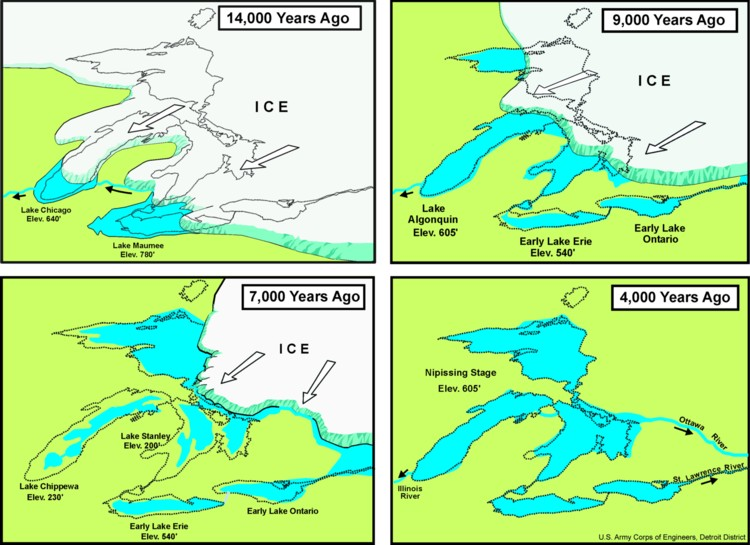
A diagram of the formation of the Great Lakes

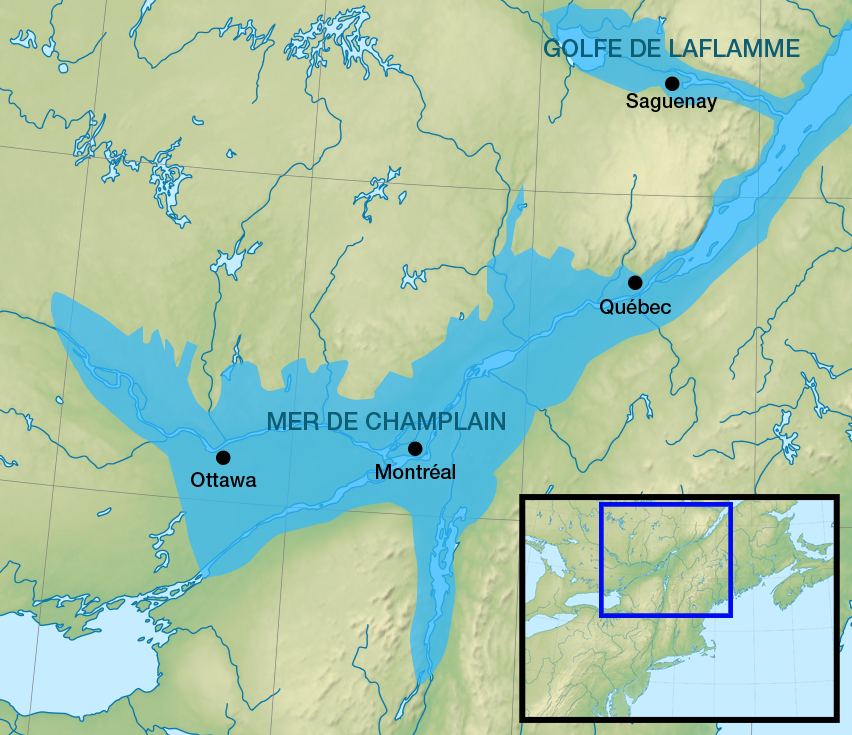
The Champlain Sea – The best evidence of this former sea is the vast clay plain deposited along the Ottawa and St. Lawrence Rivers.

It has been estimated that the foundational geology that created the conditions shaping the present day upper Great Lakes was laid from 1.1 to 1.2 billion years ago, when two previously fused tectonic plates split apart and created the Midcontinent Rift, which crossed the Great Lakes Tectonic Zone. A valley was formed providing a basin that eventually became modern day Lake Superior. When a second fault line, the Saint Lawrence rift, formed approximately 570 million years ago, the basis for Lakes Ontario and Erie was created, along with what would become the Saint Lawrence River.

The Great Lakes are estimated to have been formed at the end of the Last Glacial Period (the Wisconsin glaciation ended 10,000 to 12,000 years ago), when the Laurentide Ice Sheet receded. The retreat of the ice sheet left behind a large amount of meltwater (Lake Algonquin, Lake Chicago, Glacial Lake Iroquois, and Champlain Sea) that filled up the basins that the glaciers had carved, thus creating the Great Lakes as they are today. Because of the uneven nature of glacier erosion, some higher hills became Great Lakes islands. The Niagara Escarpment follows the contour of the Great Lakes between New York and Wisconsin. Land below the glaciers "rebounded" as it was uncovered. Since the glaciers covered some areas longer than others, this glacial rebound occurred at different rates.

== Climate ==
The Great Lakes have a humid continental climate, Köppen climate classification Dfa (in southern areas) and Dfb (in northern parts) with varying influences from air masses from other regions including dry, cold Arctic systems, mild Pacific air masses from the west, and warm, wet tropical systems from the south and the Gulf of Mexico. The lakes have a moderating effect on the climate; they can also increase precipitation totals and produce lake effect snowfall.

=== Lake effect ===
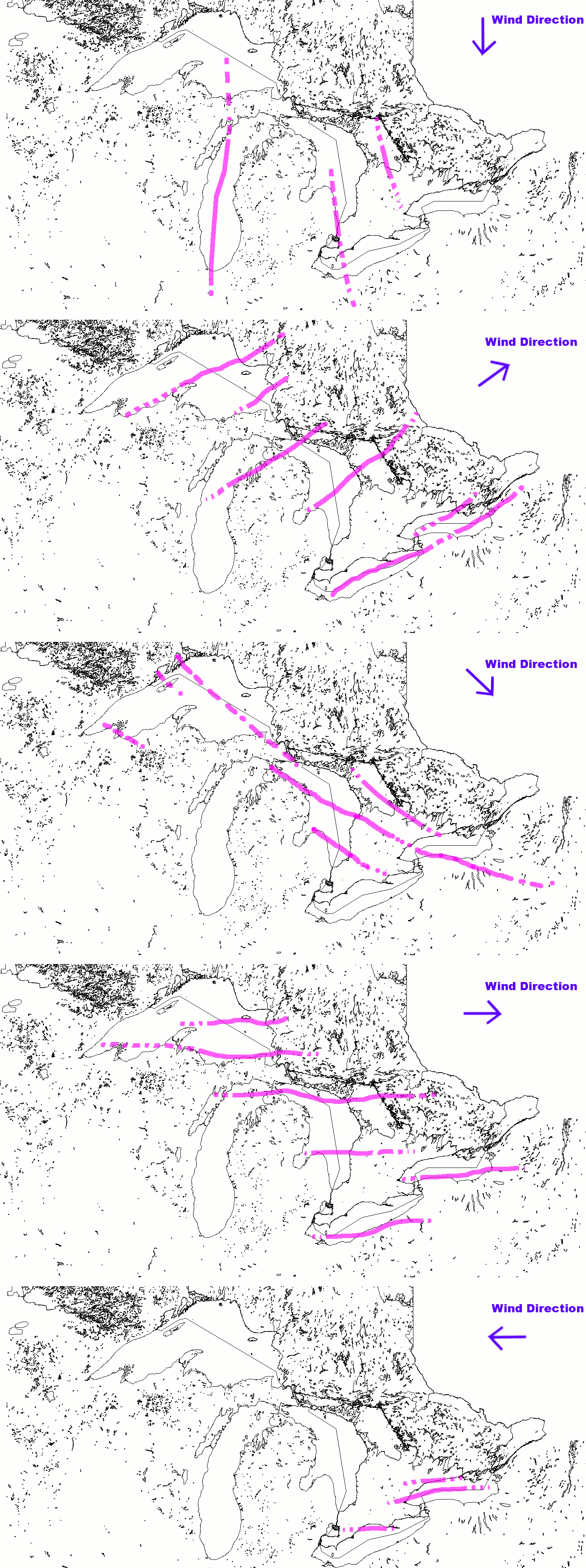
The location of common lake effect bands on the Great Lakes

The Great Lakes can have an effect on regional weather called lake-effect snow, which is sometimes very localized. Even late in winter, the lakes often have no icepack in the middle. The prevailing winds from the west pick up the air and moisture from the lake surface, which is slightly warmer in relation to the cold surface winds above. As the slightly warmer, moist air passes over the colder land surface, the moisture often produces concentrated, heavy snowfall that sets up in bands or "streamers". This is similar to the effect of warmer air dropping snow as it passes over mountain ranges. During freezing weather with high winds, the "snowbelts" receive regular snowfall from this localized weather pattern, especially along the eastern shores of the lakes. Snowbelts are found in Wisconsin, Indiana, Michigan, Ohio, Pennsylvania, New York, and Ontario. Related to the lake effect is the regular occurrence of fog, particularly along the shorelines of the lakes. This is most noticeable along Lake Superior's shores.

The lakes tend to moderate seasonal temperatures to some degree but not with as large an influence as do large oceans; they absorb heat and cool the air in summer, then slowly radiate that heat in autumn. They protect against frost during transitional weather and keep the summertime temperatures cooler than further inland. This effect can be very localized and overridden by offshore wind patterns. This temperature buffering produces areas known as "fruit belts", where fruit can be produced that is typically grown much farther south. For instance, western Michigan has apple orchards, and cherry orchards are cultivated adjacent to the lake shore as far north as the Grand Traverse Bay. Near Collingwood, Ontario, commercial fruit orchards, including a few wineries, exist near the shoreline of southern Nottawasaga Bay. The eastern shore of Lake Michigan and the southern shore of Lake Erie have many successful wineries because of the lakes' moderating effects, as do the large commercial fruit and wine growing areas of the Niagara Peninsula located between Lake Erie and Lake Ontario. A similar phenomenon allows wineries to flourish in the Finger Lakes region of New York, as well as in Prince Edward County, Ontario, on Lake Ontario's northeast shore.

The Great Lakes have been observed to help intensify storms, such as Hurricane Hazel in 1954, and the 2011 Goderich, Ontario tornado, which moved onshore as a tornadic waterspout. In 1996, a rare tropical or subtropical storm was observed forming in Lake Huron, dubbed the 1996 Lake Huron cyclone. Rather large severe thunderstorms covering wide areas are well known in the Great Lakes during mid-summer; these Mesoscale convective complexes or MCCs can cause damage to wide swaths of forest and shatter glass in city buildings. These storms mainly occur during the night, and the systems sometimes have small embedded tornadoes, but more often straight-line winds accompanied by intense lightning.

== Ecology ==
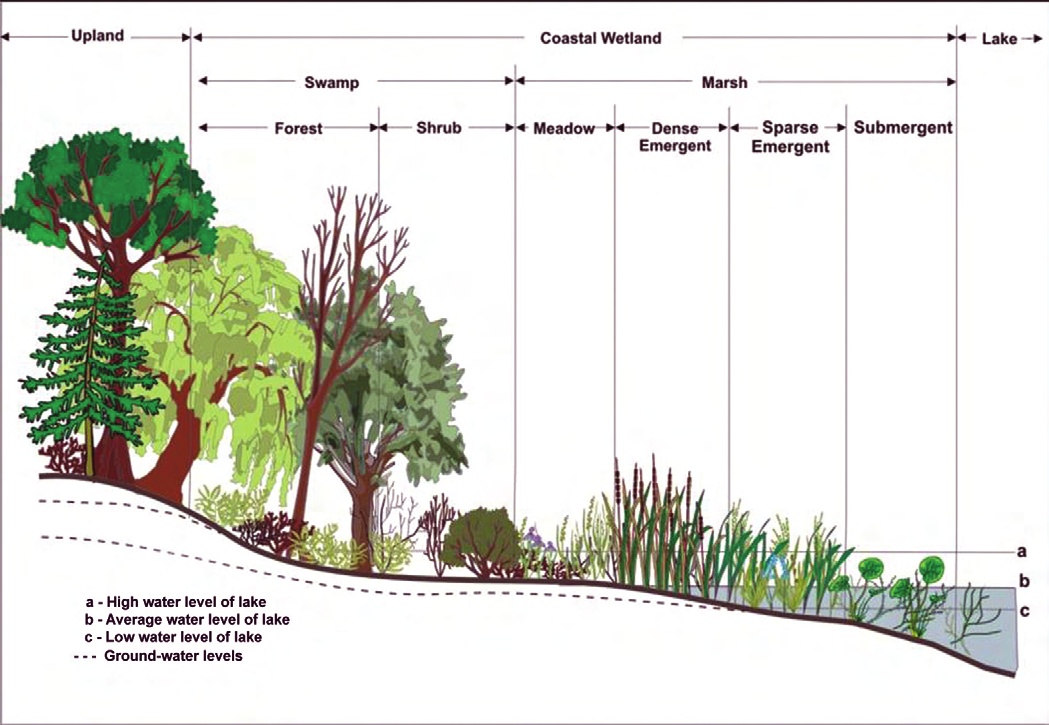
Generalized schematic of Great Lakes waterline ecosystem

Historically, the Great Lakes, in addition to their lake ecology, were surrounded by various forest ecoregions (except in a relatively small area of southeast Lake Michigan where savanna or prairie occasionally intruded). Logging, urbanization, and agriculture uses have changed that relationship. In the early 21st century, Lake Superior's shores are 91% forested, Lake Huron 68%, Lake Ontario 49%, Lake Michigan 41%, and Lake Erie, where logging and urbanization has been most extensive, 21%. Some of these forests are second or third growth (i.e. they have been logged before, changing their composition). At least 13 wildlife species are documented as becoming extinct since the arrival of Europeans, and many more are threatened or endangered. Meanwhile, exotic and invasive species have also been introduced.

=== Fauna ===
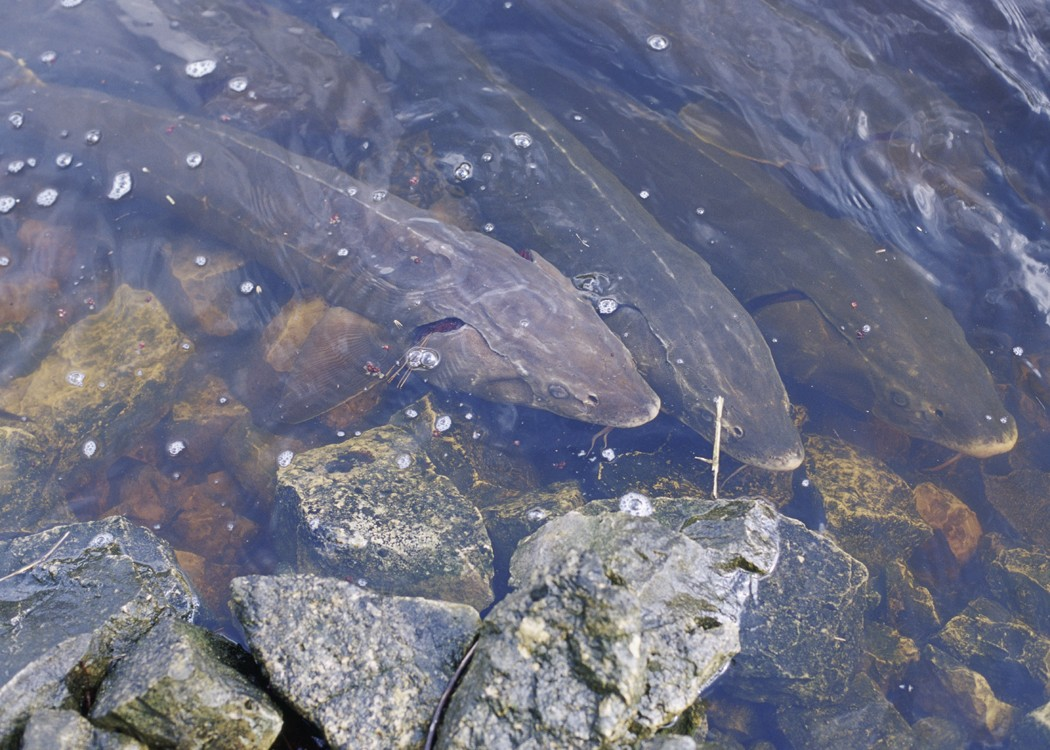
Lake sturgeon, the largest native fish in the Great Lakes and the subject of extensive commercial fishing in the 19th and 20th centuries is listed as a threatened species

While the organisms living on the bottom of shallow waters are similar to those found in smaller lakes, the deep waters contain organisms found only in deep, cold lakes of the northern latitudes. These include the delicate opossum shrimp (order Mysida), the deepwater scud (a crustacean of the order Amphipoda), two types of copepods, and the deepwater sculpin (a spiny, large-headed fish).

The Great Lakes are an important source of fishing. Early European settlers were astounded by both the variety and quantity of fish; there were 150 different species in the Great Lakes. Throughout history, fish populations were the early indicator of the condition of the Lakes and have remained one of the key indicators even in the current era of sophisticated analyses and measuring instruments. According to the bi-national (U.S. and Canadian) resource book, The Great Lakes: An Environmental Atlas and Resource Book: "The largest Great Lakes fish harvests were recorded in 1889 and 1899 at some 67,000 tonnes (66,000 long tons; 74,000 short tons) [147 million pounds]."

By 1801, the New York Legislature found it necessary to pass regulations curtailing obstructions to the natural migrations of Atlantic salmon from Lake Erie into their spawning channels. In the early 19th century, the government of Upper Canada found it necessary to introduce similar legislation prohibiting the use of weirs and nets at the mouths of Lake Ontario's tributaries. Other protective legislation was passed, but enforcement remained difficult.

On both sides of the Canada–United States border, the proliferation of dams and impoundments have multiplied, necessitating more regulatory efforts. Concerns by the mid-19th century included obstructions in the rivers which prevented salmon and lake sturgeon from reaching their spawning grounds. The Wisconsin Fisheries Commission noted a reduction of roughly 25% in general fish harvests by 1875. The states have removed dams from rivers where necessary.

Overfishing has been cited as a possible reason for a decrease in population of various whitefish, important because of their culinary desirability and, hence, economic consequence. Moreover, between 1879 and 1899, reported whitefish harvests declined from some 24.3 million pounds (11 million kg) to just over 9 million pounds (4 million kg). By 1900, commercial fishermen on Lake Michigan were hauling in an average of 41 million pounds of fish annually. By 1938, Wisconsin's commercial fishing operations were motorized and mechanized, generating jobs for more than 2,000 workers, and hauling 14 million pounds per year. The population of giant freshwater mussels was eliminated as the mussels were harvested for use as buttons by early Great Lakes entrepreneurs.

The Great Lakes: An Environmental Atlas and Resource Book (1972) notes: "Only pockets remain of the once large commercial fishery." Water quality improvements realized during the 1970s and 1980s, combined with successful salmonid stocking programs, have enabled the growth of a large recreational fishery. The last commercial fisherman left Milwaukee in 2011 because of overfishing and anthropogenic changes to the biosphere.

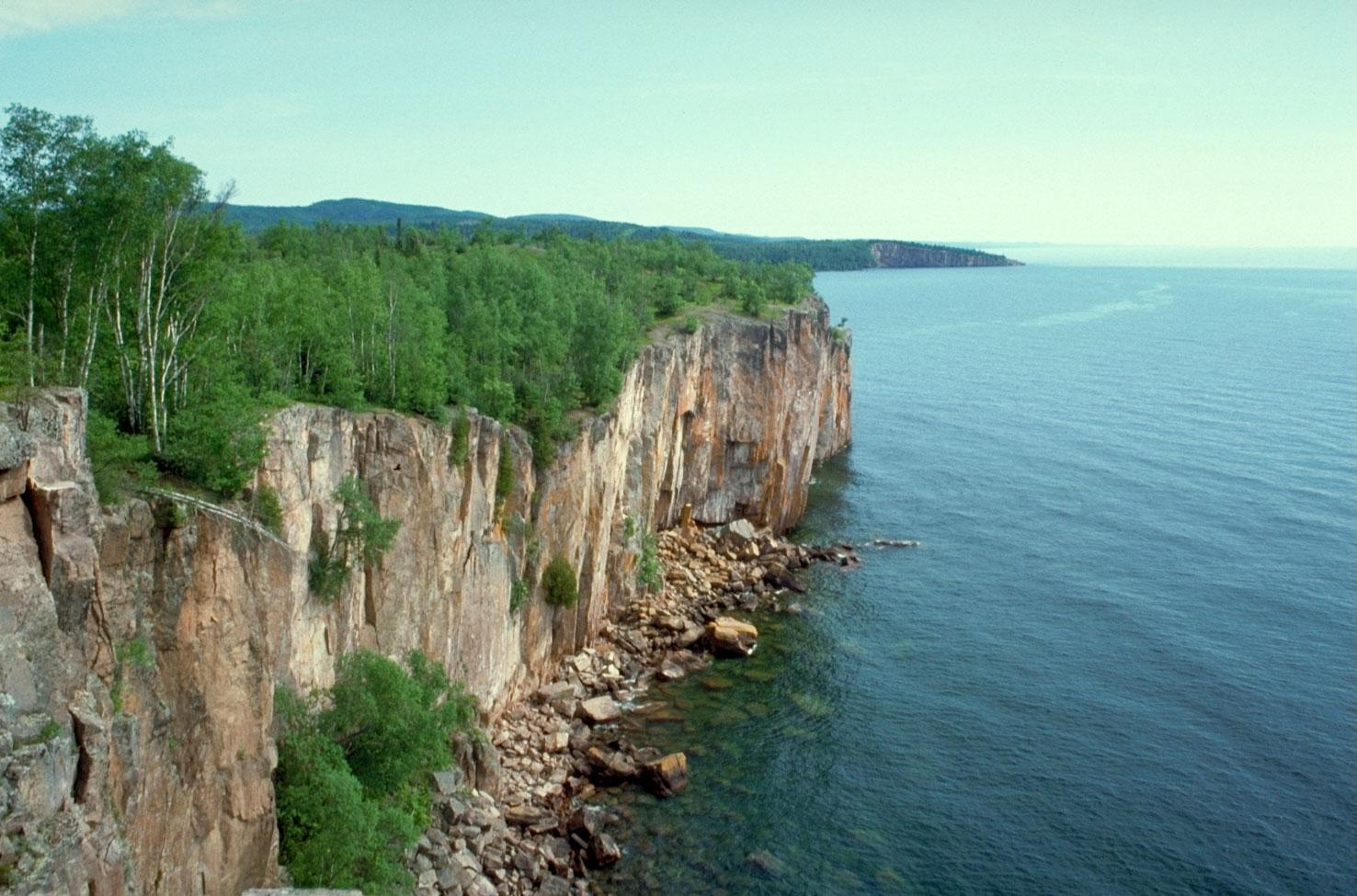
Cliffs at Palisade Head on Lake Superior in Minnesota near Silver Bay.

=== Invasive species ===
Since the 19th century, an estimated 160 new species have found their way into the Great Lakes ecosystem; many have become invasive; the overseas ship ballast and ship hull parasitism are causing severe economic and ecological impacts. According to the Inland Seas Education Association, on average a new species enters the Great Lakes every eight months. Introductions into the Great Lakes include the zebra mussel, which was first discovered in 1988, and quagga mussel in 1989. Since 2000, the invasive quagga mussel has smothered the bottom of Lake Michigan almost from shore to shore, and their numbers are estimated at 900 trillion. The mollusks are efficient filter feeders, competing with native mussels and reducing available food and spawning grounds for fish. In addition, the mussels may be a nuisance to industries by clogging pipes. The U.S. Fish and Wildlife Service estimated in 2007 that the economic impact of the zebra mussel could be about $5 billion over the next decade. The state of Michigan has had to develop legislation and regulations to help protect against these invasive species. Aquatic invasive species regulations in Michigan have been put in place to combat the influx of species.

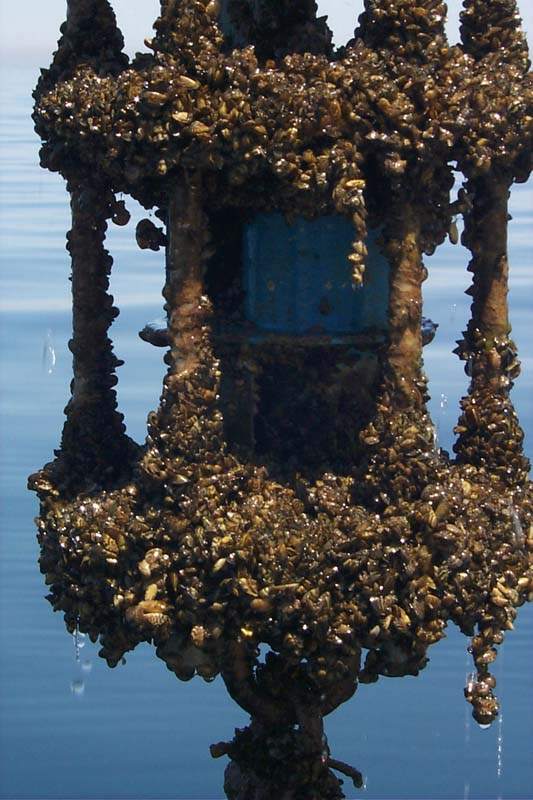
A zebra mussel–encrusted vector-averaging current meter from Lake Michigan.

The alewife first entered the system west of Lake Ontario via 19th-century canals. By the 1960s, the small silver fish had become a familiar nuisance to beach goers across Lakes Michigan, Huron, and Erie. Periodic mass die-offs result in vast numbers of the fish washing up on shore; estimates by various governments have placed the percentage of Lake Michigan's biomass which was made up of alewives in the early 1960s as high as 90%. In the late 1960s, the various state and federal governments began stocking several species of salmonids, including the native lake trout as well as non-native Chinook and coho salmon; by the 1980s, alewife populations had dropped drastically. The ruffe, a small percid fish from Eurasia, became the most abundant fish species in Lake Superior's Saint Louis River within five years of its detection in 1986. Its range, which has expanded to Lake Huron, poses a significant threat to the lower lake fishery. Five years after first being observed in the St. Clair River, the round goby can now be found in all of the Great Lakes. The goby is considered undesirable for several reasons: it preys upon bottom-feeding fish, overruns optimal habitat, spawns multiple times a season, and can survive poor water quality conditions.

The influx of parasitic sea lamprey populations after the development of the Erie Canal and the much later Welland Canal led to the two federal governments of the United States and Canada working on joint proposals to control it. By the mid-1950s, the lake trout populations of Lakes Michigan and Huron were reduced, with the lamprey deemed largely to blame. This led to the launch of the bi-national Great Lakes Fishery Commission.

Several species of exotic water fleas have accidentally been introduced into the Great Lakes, such as the spiny waterflea, Bythotrephes longimanus, and the fishhook waterflea, Cercopagis pengoi, potentially having an effect on the zooplankton population. Several species of crayfish have also been introduced that may contend with native crayfish populations. More recently an electric fence has been set up across the Chicago Sanitary and Ship Canal in order to keep several species of invasive Asian carp out of the lakes. These fast-growing planktivorous fish have heavily colonized the Mississippi and Illinois river systems. Invasive species, particularly zebra and quagga mussels, may be at least partially responsible for the collapse of the deepwater demersal fish community in Lake Huron, as well as drastic unprecedented changes in the zooplankton community of the lake.

=== Microbiology ===
Scientists understand that the micro-aquatic life of the lakes is abundant but know very little about some of the most plentiful microbes and their environmental effects in the Great Lakes. Although a drop of lake water may contain 1 million bacteria cells and 10 million viruses, only since 2012 has there been a long-term study of the lakes' micro-organisms. Between 2012 and 2019 more than 160 new species have been discovered.

=== Flora ===
Native habitats and ecoregions in the Great Lakes region include:

- Alvar
- Boreal rich fen (such as in Door County)
- Eastern forest-boreal transition
- Eastern Great Lakes lowland forests
- Southern Great Lakes forests
- Central forest-grasslands transition
- Upper Midwest forest-savanna transition
- Western Great Lakes forests
- Central Canadian Shield forests
- Laurentian Mixed Forest Province
- Beech-maple forest
- Habitats of the Indiana Dunes

Plant lists include:

- List of Michigan flowers
- List of Minnesota wild flowers
- List of Minnesota trees

==== Logging ====
Logging of the extensive forests in the Great Lakes region removed riparian and adjacent tree cover over rivers and streams, which provide shade, moderating water temperatures in fish spawning grounds. Removal of trees also destabilized the soil, with greater volumes washed into stream beds causing siltation of gravel beds, and more frequent flooding.

Running cut logs down the tributary rivers into the Great Lakes also dislocated sediments. In 1884, the New York Fish Commission determined that the dumping of sawmill waste (chips and sawdust) had impacted fish populations.

=== Pollution ===
The first U.S. Clean Water Act, passed by a Congressional override after being vetoed by U.S. President Richard Nixon in 1972, was a key piece of legislation, along with the bi-national Great Lakes Water Quality Agreement signed by Canada and the U.S. A variety of steps taken to process industrial and municipal pollution discharges into the system greatly improved water quality by the 1980s, and Lake Erie in particular is significantly cleaner. Discharge of toxic substances has been sharply reduced. Federal and state regulations control substances like PCBs. The first of 43 "Great Lakes Areas of Concern" to be formally "de-listed" through successful cleanup was Ontario's Collingwood Harbour in 1994; Ontario's Severn Sound followed in 2003. Presque Isle Bay in Pennsylvania is formally listed as in recovery, as is Ontario's Spanish Harbour. Dozens of other Areas of Concern have received partial cleanups such as the Rouge River (Michigan) and Waukegan Harbor (Illinois).

Phosphate detergents were historically a major source of nutrient to the Great Lakes algae blooms in particular in the warmer and shallower portions of the system such as Lake Erie, Saginaw Bay, Green Bay, and the southernmost portion of Lake Michigan. By the mid-1980s, most jurisdictions bordering the Great Lakes had controlled phosphate detergents. Blue-green algae, or cyanobacteria blooms, have been problematic on Lake Erie since 2011. "Not enough is being done to stop fertilizer and phosphorus from getting into the lake and causing blooms," said Michael McKay, executive director of the Great Lakes Institute for Environmental Research (GLIER) at the University of Windsor. The largest Lake Erie bloom to date occurred in 2015, exceeding the severity index at 10.5 and in 2011 at a 10. In early August 2019, satellite images depicted a bloom stretching up to 1,300 square kilometers on Lake Erie, with the heaviest concentration near Toledo, Ohio. A large bloom does not necessarily mean the cyanobacteria ... will produce toxins", said Michael McKay, of the University of Windsor. Water quality testing was underway in August 2019.

==== Mercury ====
Until 1970, mercury was not listed as a harmful chemical, according to the United States Federal Water Quality Administration. In the 21st century, mercury has become more apparent in water tests. Mercury compounds have been used in paper mills to prevent slime from forming during their production, and chemical companies have used mercury to separate chlorine from brine solutions. Studies conducted by the Environmental Protection Agency have shown that when the mercury comes in contact with many of the bacteria and compounds in the fresh water, it forms the compound methyl mercury, which has a much greater impact on human health than elemental mercury due to a higher propensity for absorption. This form of mercury is not detrimental to a majority of fish types, but is very detrimental to people and other wildlife animals who consume the fish. Mercury has been known for health related problems such as birth defects in humans and animals, and the near extinction of eagles in the Great Lakes region.

==== Sewage ====
The amount of raw sewage dumped into the waters was the primary focus of both the first Great Lakes Water Quality Agreement and federal laws passed in both countries during the 1970s. Implementation of secondary treatment of municipal sewage by major cities greatly reduced the routine discharge of untreated sewage during the 1970s and 1980s. The International Joint Commission in 2009 summarized the change: "Since the early 1970s, the level of treatment to reduce pollution from waste water discharges to the Great Lakes has improved considerably. This is a result of significant expenditures to date on both infrastructure and technology, and robust regulatory systems that have proven to be, on the whole, quite effective." The commission reported that all urban sewage treatment systems on the U.S. side of the lakes had implemented secondary treatment, as had all on the Canadian side except for five small systems.

Though contrary to federal laws in both countries, those treatment system upgrades have not yet eliminated combined sewer overflow events. This describes when older sewerage systems, which combine storm water with sewage into single sewers heading to the treatment plant, are temporarily overwhelmed by heavy rainstorms. Local sewage treatment authorities then must release untreated effluent, a mix of rainwater and sewage, into local water bodies. While enormous public investments such as the Deep Tunnel projects in Chicago and Milwaukee have greatly reduced the frequency and volume of these events, they have not been eliminated. The number of such overflow events in Ontario, for example, is flat according to the International Joint Commission. Reports about this issue on the U.S. side highlight five large municipal systems (those of Detroit, Cleveland, Buffalo, Milwaukee and Gary) as being the largest current periodic sources of untreated discharges into the Great Lakes.

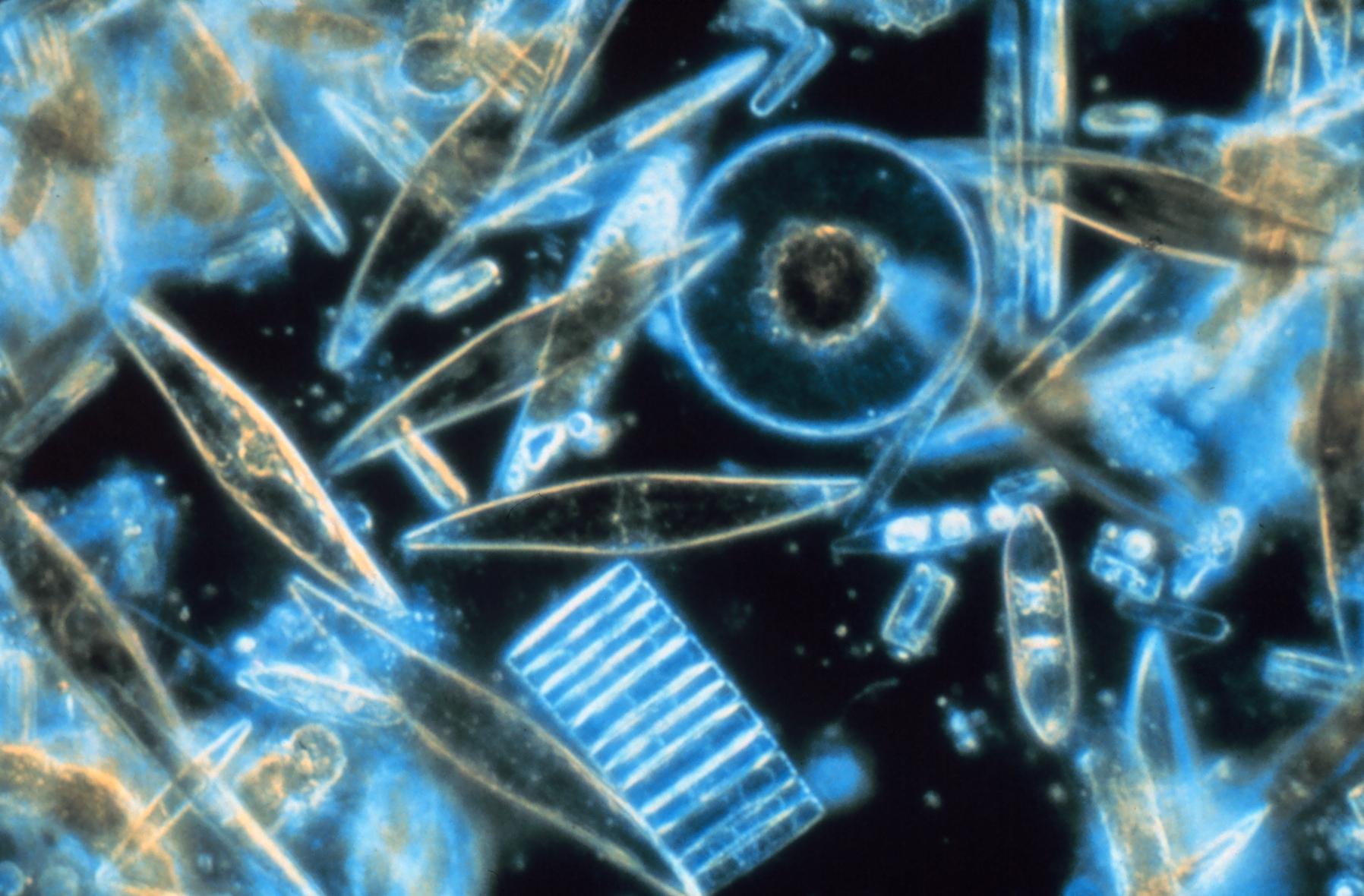
Diatoms of different sizes seen through the microscope. These minuscule phytoplankton are encased within a silicate cell wall.

The fish of the Great Lakes have anti-depressant drugs meant for humans in their brains, which has caused concerns. The number of American adults who take anti-depressant drugs rose from 7.7% of all American adults in 1999–2002 to 12.7% in 2011–2014. As the anti-depressant drugs pass out of human bodies and through sanitation systems into the Great Lakes, this has resulted in fish in the Great Lakes with twenty times the level of anti-depressants in their brains than what is in the water, leading to the fish being exceedingly happy and hence less risk-averse, to the extent of damaging the fish populations.

==== Plastic ====
Researchers have found that more than 22 million pounds (10.0 kt) of plastic end up in the Great Lakes each year. Plastics in the water break up into very small particles known as microplastics. Microplastics can also come from synthetic clothing washed down the drains. Plastic waste found in the lakes include single-use plastics, plastics used in packaging, takeout containers as well as pre-production pellets produced by plastics industry. High concentrations of microplastics were discovered in 100 percent of the fish that were studied by researchers from the Rochman Lab. About 50 million pounds (23 kt) of fish is harvested each year from Great Lakes which has raised concerns on how this might affect human health. Microscopic pieces of plastic have also been found in drinking water coming from Great Lakes. It is estimated that nearly 40 million people in the region rely on drinking water from the Great Lakes.

A number of self-operating floating devices called Seabin, were put in the Great Lakes to capture plastic trash as part of the Great Lakes Plastic Cleanup project. The project captured 74,000 pieces of trash using this technology between 2020 and 2021; however, it does not claim to catch up with 22 million pounds (10.0 kt) of plastic that ends up in Great Lakes every year. The production, consumption, and throwing away of plastics seems to remain the core of Great Lakes trash problem.

=== Impacts of climate change on algae ===
Algae such as diatoms, along with other phytoplankton, are photosynthetic primary producers supporting the food web of the Great Lakes, and have been affected by global warming. The changes in the size or in the function of the primary producers may have a direct or an indirect impact on the food web. Photosynthesis carried out by diatoms constitutes about one fifth of the total photosynthesis. By taking CO_{2} out of the water to photosynthesize, diatoms help to stabilize the pH of the water, as CO_{2} would react with water to produce carbonic acid.

CO_{2} + H_{2}O ⇌ HCO^{−}_{3} + H^{+}

Diatoms acquire inorganic carbon through passive diffusion of CO_{2} and HCO^{−}_{3}, and use carbonic anhydrase mediated active transport to speed up this process. Large diatoms require more carbon uptake than smaller diatoms. There is a positive correlation between the surface area and the chlorophyll concentration of diatom cells.

== History ==
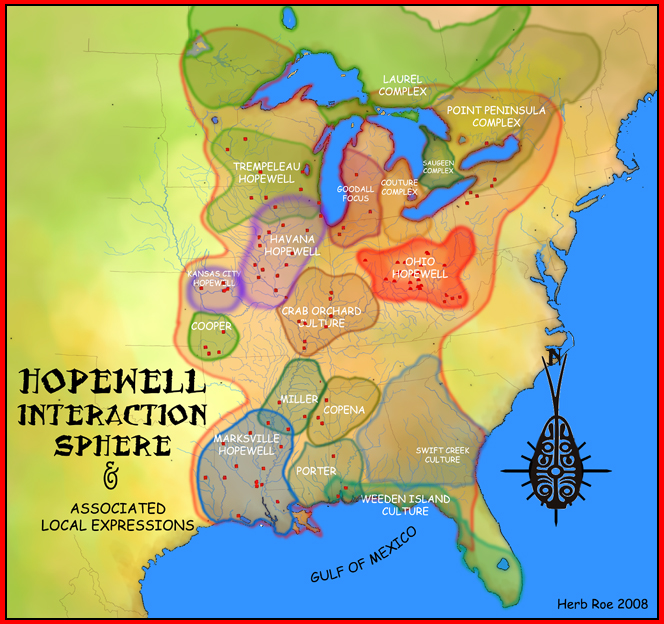
Great Lakes area of the Hopewell Interaction Area:
PP=Point Peninsula complex
S=Saugeen complex
L=Laurel complex

Several Indigenous populations (Paleo-indians) inhabited the region around 10,000 BC, after the end of the Wisconsin glaciation. The peoples of the Great Lakes traded from around 1000 AD, as copper nuggets have been extracted from the region and fashioned into ornaments and weapons in the mounds of Southern Ohio.

The Rush–Bagot Treaty signed in 1818, after the War of 1812 and the later Treaty of Washington eventually led to a complete disarmament of naval vessels in the Great Lakes. Nonetheless, both nations maintained coast guard vessels in the Great Lakes.

The brigantine Le Griffon, which was commissioned by René-Robert Cavelier, Sieur de La Salle, was built at Cayuga Creek, near the southern end of the Niagara River, and became the first known sailing ship to travel the upper Great Lakes on August 7, 1679. During settlement, the Great Lakes and its rivers were the only practical means of moving people and freight. Barges from middle North America were able to reach the Atlantic Ocean from the Great Lakes when the Welland Canal opened in 1824 and the later Erie Canal opened in 1825. By 1848, with the opening of the Illinois and Michigan Canal at Chicago, direct access to the Mississippi River was possible from the lakes. With these two canals an all-inland water route was provided between New York City and New Orleans.

The main business of many of the passenger lines in the 19th century was transporting immigrants. Many of the larger cities owe their existence to their position on the lakes as a freight destination as well as for being a magnet for immigrants. After railroads and surface roads developed, the freight and passenger businesses dwindled and, except for ferries and a few foreign cruise ships, have now vanished. The immigration routes still have an effect today. Immigrants often formed their own communities, and some areas have a pronounced ethnicity, such as Dutch, German, Polish, Finnish, and many others. Since many immigrants settled for a time in New England before moving westward, many areas on the U.S. side of the Great Lakes also have a New England feel, especially in home styles and accent.

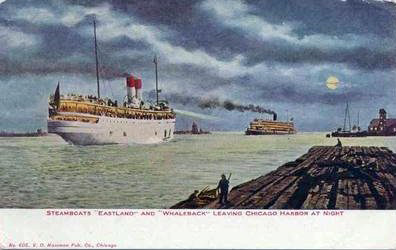
The passenger ship SS Eastland (foreground) leaving Chicago, c. 1909

Since general freight these days is transported by railroads and trucks, domestic ships mostly move bulk cargoes, such as iron ore, coal and limestone for the steel industry. The domestic bulk freight developed because of the nearby mines. It was more economical to transport the ingredients for steel to centralized plants rather than to make steel on the spot. Grain exports are also a major cargo on the lakes. In the 19th and early 20th centuries, iron and other ores such as copper were shipped south on (downbound ships), and supplies, food, and coal were shipped north (upbound). Because of the location of the coal fields in Pennsylvania and West Virginia, and the general northeast track of the Appalachian Mountains, railroads naturally developed shipping routes that went due north to ports such as Erie, Pennsylvania and Ashtabula, Ohio.

Because the lake maritime community largely developed independently, it has some distinctive vocabulary. Ships, no matter the size, are called "boats". When the sailing ships gave way to steamships, they were called "steamboats"—the same term used on the Mississippi. The ships also have a distinctive design; ships that primarily trade on the lakes are known as lake freighters or "lakers". Foreign boats are known as "salties". One of the more common sights on the lakes, since about 1950, has been the 1,000-by-105-foot (305 by 32 m), 78,850-long-ton (80,120-metric-ton) self-unloader. This is a laker with a conveyor belt system that can unload itself by swinging a crane over the side. Today, the Great Lakes fleet is much smaller in numbers than it once was because of the increased use of overland freight, and a few larger ships replacing many small ones.

During World War II, the risk of submarine attacks against coastal training facilities motivated the United States Navy to operate two aircraft carriers on the Great Lakes, USS Sable and USS Wolverine. Both served as training ships to qualify naval aviators in carrier landing and takeoff. Lake Champlain briefly became the sixth Great Lake of the United States on March 6, 1998, when President Clinton signed Senate Bill 927. This bill, which reauthorized the National Sea Grant Program, contained a line declaring Lake Champlain to be a Great Lake. Not coincidentally, this status allows neighboring states to apply for additional federal research and education funds allocated to these national resources. Following a small uproar, the Senate voted to revoke the designation on March 24 (although New York and Vermont universities would continue to receive funds to monitor and study the lake).

Alan B. McCullough has written that the fishing industry of the Great Lakes got its start "on the American side of Lake Ontario in Chaumont Bay, near the Maumee River on Lake Erie, and on the Detroit River at about the time of the War of 1812". Although the region was sparsely populated until the 1830s, so there was not much local demand and transporting fish was prohibitively costly, there were economic and infrastructure developments that were promising for the future of the fishing industry going into the 1830s. Particularly, the 1825 opening of the Erie Canal and the Welland Canal a few years later. The fishing industry expanded particularly in the waters associated with the fur trade that connect Lake Erie and Lake Huron. In fact, two major suppliers of fish in the 1830s were the fur trading companies Hudson's Bay Company and the American Fur Company.

The catch from these waters was sent to the growing market for salted fish in Detroit, where merchants involved in the fur trade had already gained some experience handling salted fish. One such merchant was John P. Clark, a shipbuilder and merchant who began selling fish in the area of Manitowoc, Wisconsin where whitefish was abundant. Another operation cropped up in Georgian Bay, Canadian waters plentiful with trout as well as whitefish. In 1831, Alexander MacGregor from Goderich, Ontario found whitefish and herring in abundant supply around the Fishing Islands. A contemporary account by Methodist missionary John Evans describes the fish as resembling a "bright cloud moving rapidly through the water".

From 1844 through 1857, palace steamers carried passengers and cargo around the Great Lakes. In the first half of the 20th century large luxurious passenger steamers sailed the lakes in opulence. The Detroit and Cleveland Navigation Company had several vessels at the time and hired workers from all walks of life to help operate these vessels. Several ferries currently operate on the Great Lakes to carry passengers to various islands. As of 2007, four car ferry services cross the Great Lakes, two on Lake Michigan: a steamer from Ludington, Michigan, to Manitowoc, Wisconsin, and a high speed catamaran from Milwaukee to Muskegon, Michigan, one on Lake Erie: a boat from Kingsville, Ontario, or Leamington, Ontario, to Pelee Island, Ontario, then onto Sandusky, Ohio, and one on Lake Huron: the MS Chi-Cheemaun runs between Tobermory and South Baymouth, Manitoulin Island, operated by the Owen Sound Transportation Company. An international ferry across Lake Ontario from Rochester, New York, to Toronto ran during 2004 and 2005 but is no longer in operation.

=== Shipwrecks ===
The large size of the Great Lakes increases the risk of water travel; storms and reefs are common threats. The lakes are prone to sudden and severe storms, in particular in the autumn, from late October until early December. Hundreds of ships have met their end on the lakes. The greatest concentration of shipwrecks lies near Thunder Bay (Michigan), beneath Lake Huron, near the point where eastbound and westbound shipping lanes converge. The Lake Superior shipwreck coast from Grand Marais, Michigan, to Whitefish Point became known as the "Graveyard of the Great Lakes". More vessels have been lost in the Whitefish Point area than any other part of Lake Superior. The Whitefish Point Underwater Preserve serves as an underwater museum to protect the many shipwrecks in this area.

The first ship to sink in Lake Michigan was Le Griffon, also the first ship to sail the Great Lakes. Caught in a 1679 storm while trading furs between Green Bay and Michilimacinac, she was lost with all hands aboard. Its wreck may have been found in 2004, but a wreck subsequently discovered in a different location was also claimed in 2014 to be Le Griffon. The largest and last major freighter wrecked on the lakes was the SS Edmund Fitzgerald, which sank on November 10, 1975, just over 17 miles (30 km) offshore from Whitefish Point on Lake Superior. The largest loss of life in a shipwreck out on the lakes may have been that of Lady Elgin, wrecked in 1860 with the loss of around 400 lives on Lake Michigan. In an incident at a Chicago dock in 1915, the SS Eastland rolled over while loading passengers, killing 844.

In 2007, the Great Lakes Shipwreck Historical Society announced that it had found the wreckage of Cyprus, a 420-foot (130 m) long, century-old ore carrier. Cyprus sank during a Lake Superior storm on October 11, 1907, during its second voyage while hauling iron ore from Superior, Wisconsin, to Buffalo, New York. The entire crew of 23 drowned, except one, Charles Pitz, who floated on a life raft for almost seven hours. In 2008, deep sea divers in Lake Ontario found the wreck of the 1780 Royal Navy warship HMS Ontario in what has been described as an "archaeological miracle". There are no plans to raise her as the site is being treated as a war grave. In 2010, L.R. Doty was found in Lake Michigan by an exploration diving team led by dive boat Captain Jitka Hanakova from her boat Molly V. The ship sank in October 1898, probably attempting to rescue a small schooner, Olive Jeanette, during a terrible storm.

Still missing are the two last warships to sink in the Great Lakes, the French minesweepers Inkerman and Cerisoles, which vanished in Lake Superior during a blizzard in 1918. 78 people died, making it the largest loss of life in Lake Superior and the greatest unexplained loss of life in the Great Lakes.

The Wisconsin Shipwreck Coast National Marine Sanctuary was established in 2021 in the waters of Lake Michigan off Wisconsin. It is the site of a large number of historically significant shipwrecks.

== Economy ==
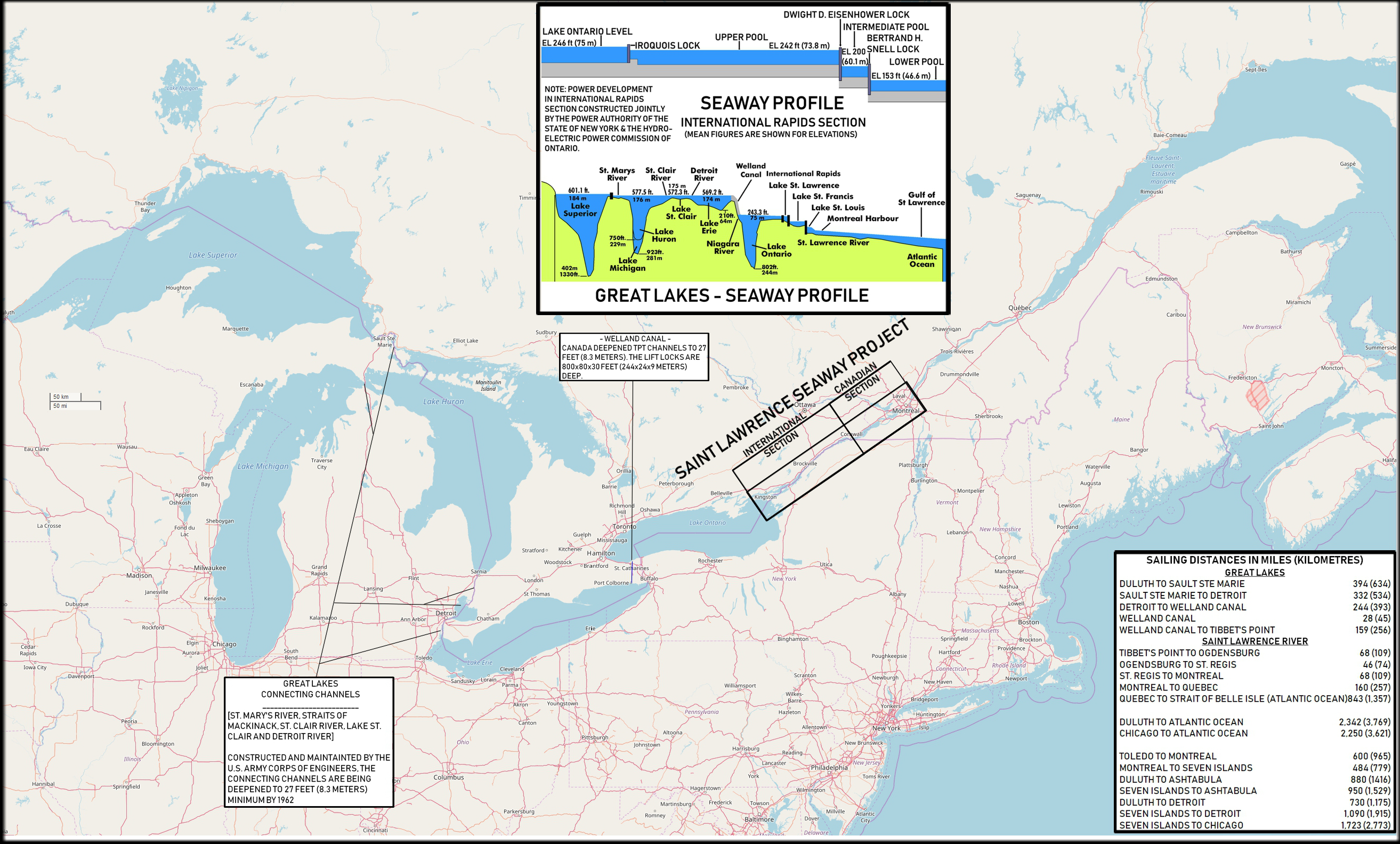
Map of the Great Lakes, Great Lakes Waterway, St. Lawrence Seaway depicting the entire length.

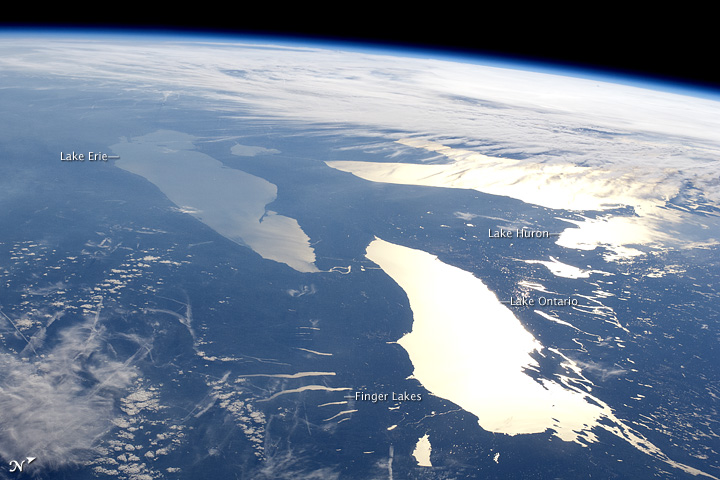
Photograph of, closest to farthest, Lakes Ontario, Erie and Huron (North is to the right) plus the Finger Lakes of upstate New York, near Lake Ontario, June 14, 2012, taken aboard the International Space Station, with lake names added

=== Shipping ===
Except when the water is frozen during winter, more than 100 lake freighters operate continuously on the Great Lakes, which remain a major water transport corridor for bulk goods. The Great Lakes Waterway connects all the lakes; the shorter Saint Lawrence Seaway connects the lakes to the Atlantic Ocean. Some lake freighters are too large to use the Seaway and operate only on the Waterway and lakes. In 2002, 162 million net tons of dry bulk cargo were moved on the Lakes. This was, in order of volume: iron ore, grain and potash. The iron ore and much of the stone and coal are used in the steel industry. There is also some shipping of liquid and containerized cargo. Major ports on the Great Lakes include Duluth-Superior, Chicago, Detroit, Cleveland, Twin Harbors, Hamilton and Thunder Bay.

=== Recreation ===
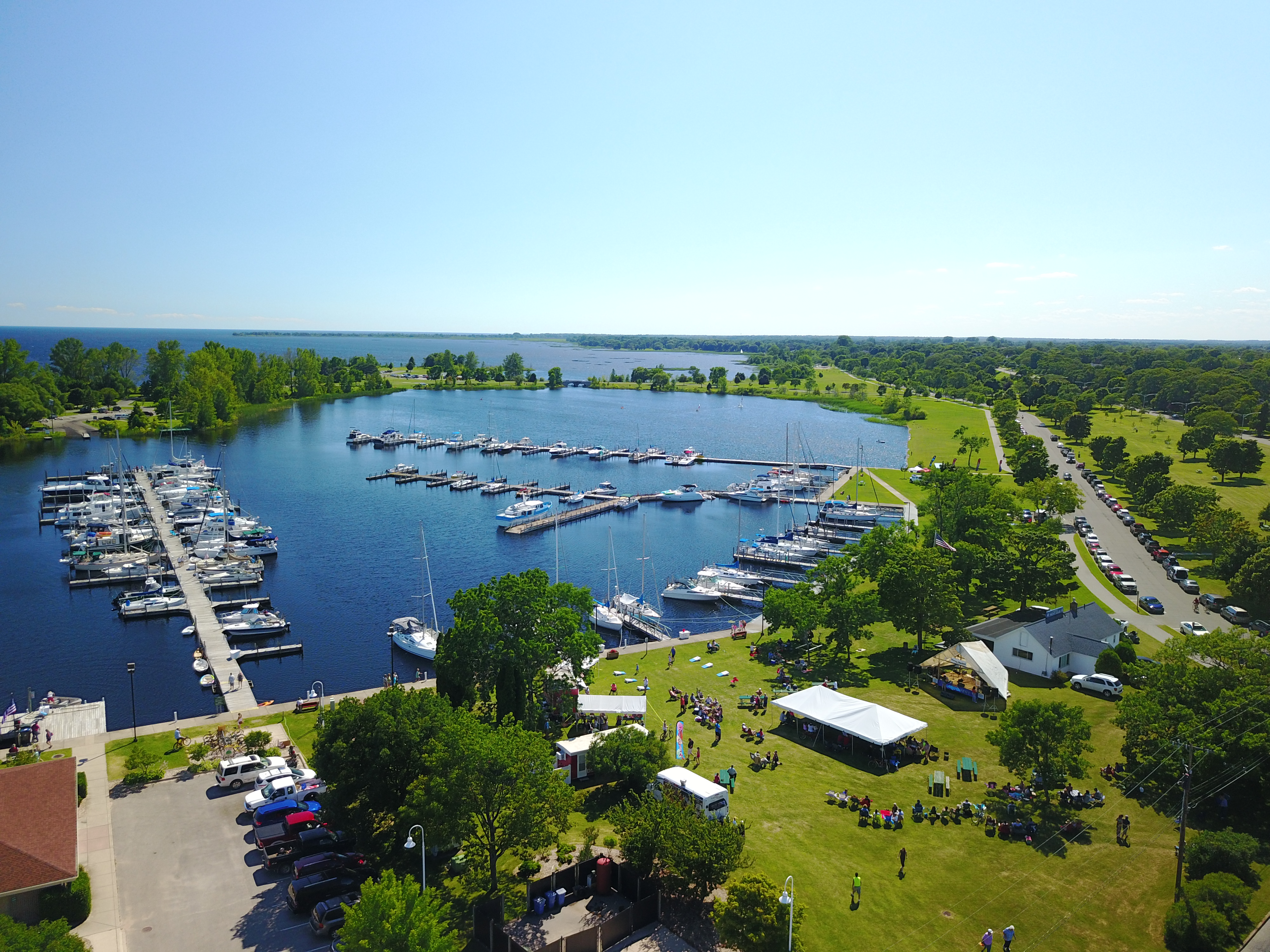
Escanaba's Ludington Park in Michigan

Tourism and recreation are major industries on the Great Lakes. A few small cruise ships operate on the Great Lakes including some sailing ships. Sport fishing, commercial fishing, and Native American fishing represent a US$4 billion a year industry with salmon, whitefish, smelt, lake trout, bass and walleye being major catches. Many other water sports are practiced on the lakes such as yachting, sea kayaking, diving, kitesurfing, powerboating, and lake surfing. The Great Lakes Circle Tour is a designated scenic road system connecting all of the Great Lakes and the Saint Lawrence River.

== Legislation ==
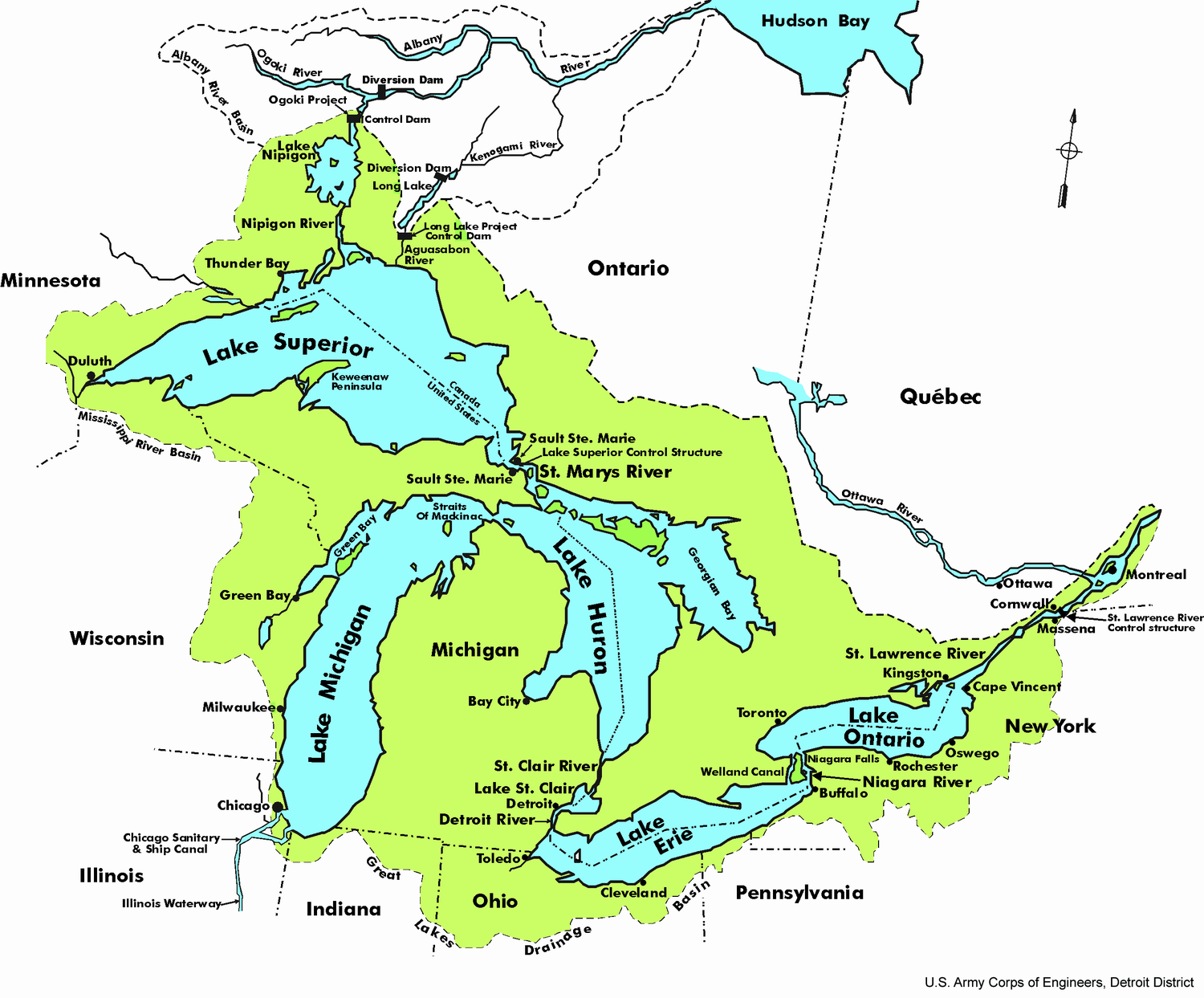
Various national, state, provincial, and municipal jurisdictions govern the Great Lakes

In 1872, a treaty gave access to the St. Lawrence River to the United States and access to Lake Michigan to the Dominion of Canada. The International Joint Commission was established in 1909 to help prevent and resolve disputes relating to the use and quality of boundary waters, and to advise Canada and the United States on questions related to water resources. Concerns over diversion of Lake water are of concern to both Americans and Canadians. Some water is diverted through the Chicago River to operate the Illinois Waterway, but the flow is limited by treaty. Possible schemes for bottled water plants and diversion to dry regions of the continent raise concerns. Under the U.S. "Water Resources Development Act of 1986", diversion of water from the Great Lakes Basin requires the approval of all eight Great Lakes governors through the Great Lakes Commission, which rarely occurs. International treaties regulate large diversions.

In 1998, the Canadian company Nova Group won approval from the Province of Ontario to withdraw 158,000,000 U.S. gallons (600,000 m^{3}) of Lake Superior water annually to ship by tanker to Asian countries. Public outcry forced the company to abandon the plan before it began. Since that time, the eight Great Lakes Governors and the Premiers of Ontario and Quebec have negotiated the Great Lakes-Saint Lawrence River Basin Sustainable Water Resources Agreement and the Great Lakes-St. Lawrence River Basin Water Resources Compact that would prevent most future diversion proposals and all long-distance ones. The agreements strengthen protection against abusive water withdrawal practices within the Great Lakes basin. On December 13, 2005, the Governors and Premiers signed these two agreements, the first of which is between all ten jurisdictions. It is somewhat more detailed and protective, though its legal strength has not yet been tested in court. The second, the Great Lakes Compact, has been approved by the state legislatures of all eight states that border the Great Lakes as well as the U.S. Congress, and was signed into law by President George W. Bush on October 3, 2008.

The Great Lakes Restoration Initiative, was funded at $475 million in the U.S. federal government's Fiscal Year 2011 budget, and $300 million in the Fiscal Year 2012 budget. Through the program a coalition of federal agencies is making grants to local and state entities for toxics cleanups, wetlands and coastline restoration projects, and invasive species-related projects. The Great Lakes Restoration Initiative Act of 2019 passed as Pub. L. 116–294 (text) (PDF) on January 5, 2021, reauthorizing the program through Fiscal Year 2026.

== See also ==
- Alliance for the Great Lakes
- Boundary Waters Treaty of 1909
- Eastern Continental Divide
- Great Lakes census statistical areas
- Great Lakes Protection Fund
- Great Lakes WATER Institute
- Great Recycling and Northern Development Canal
- Lake Ontario National Marine Sanctuary
- List of municipalities on the Great Lakes
- Michigan Islands National Wildlife Refuge
- Thunder Bay National Marine Sanctuary
- Wisconsin Shipwreck Coast National Marine Sanctuary
- Populated islands of the Great Lakes
- Sixty Years' War for control of the Great Lakes
