= Yacht delivery =

Yacht delivery is an industry organized around moving vessels including sailboats, motorboats or tall ships from one destination to another anywhere around the world on their own hulls. It is largely a private industry working on daily or lump sum rates, where normally the captain is paid the most or is the only person among the crew that is paid. There are tens of thousands of private yachts, which move from country to country or coastwise within a country annually.

Delivery of sailing yachts on their own hulls has a smaller carbon footprint than yacht transport on a ship. More than three percent of global carbon dioxide emissions can be attributed to ocean-going ships. Yacht delivery of a sailing yacht reduces carbon dioxide emissions by a factor of 20 to 70 compared to yacht transport on a ship and even further reduction is possible when the yacht is equipped with solar panels.

== Common yacht delivery routes ==
- Transatlantic: One of the most common yacht delivery routes is the transatlantic crossing, often from the Caribbean to the Mediterranean or vice versa.
- U.K to Mediterranean Sea: A common delivery due to the complexities of navigating the Bay of Biscay
- Intra-Mediterranean: Within the Mediterranean Sea, there are frequent yacht deliveries between popular ports like Monaco, Barcelona, and various Greek islands.
- Pacific Crossings: Routes between the U.S. West Coast and destinations like Hawaii or even Australia are also common.
- Coastal Routes: In countries with extensive coastlines like the United States, coastal deliveries are frequent, such as from Florida to New England.
- US Routes:
  - Atlantic East Coast: Spanning from the Florida Keys to Maine.
  - Gulf Coasts: Along the Gulf of Mexico, from the Florida Keys to the Port of Galveston in Texas.
  - Great Lakes: Offers access to both the American and Canadian sides of the Great Lakes Waterway, including the St. Lawrence River.
  - U.S. Rivers: Navigate rivers like the Mississippi, Ohio, and Hudson for access to inland regions.
  - Florida: With its extensive coastline encompassing the Florida Keys, Everglades, and Gulf of Mexico.
  - Intracoastal Waterway (ICW): Covering 3,000 miles along the Atlantic and Gulf coasts, the ICW offers a protected route to various coastal destinations.
