= John P. Clark =

American academic

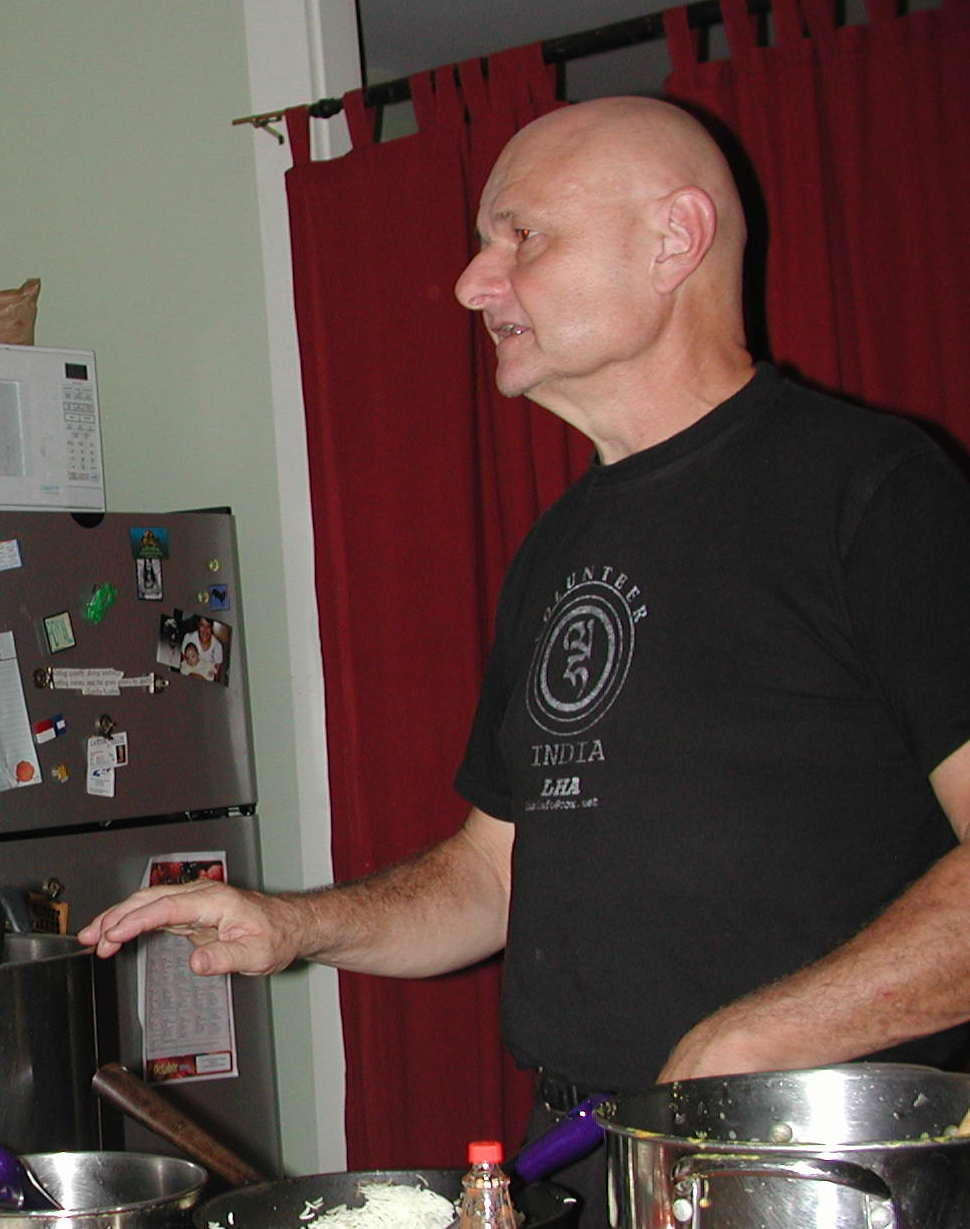
- Born: John Philip Clark; 1945 (age 80–81); New Orleans, United States

Education
- Education: Tulane University

Philosophical work
- Era: 20th-/21st-century philosophy
- Region: Western Philosophy
- School: Continental philosophy; Philosophy of ecology; Environmental philosophy; Libertarian socialism
- Main interests: Dialectics, anarchism, communitarianism, psychoanalysis, Zen Buddhism
- Notable works: The Philosophical Anarchism of William Godwin

John Philip Clark (born 1945), known professionally as John P. Clark, is an American philosopher, academic, dialectician, author, environmental activist, social theorist, and anarchist. He is Professor Emeritus of Philosophy at Loyola University New Orleans, where he was the Gregory F. Curtin Distinguished Professor in Humane Letters and the Professions. He is currently director of the La Terre Institute for Ecology and Community in Dedeaux, MS. The author and editor of several books and numerous articles, he is also known to write under the pen name Max Cafard.

== Early life and education ==
John Clark was born in New Orleans, Louisiana, on August 21, 1945, where his family had resided for twelve generations.

Clark completed his undergraduate and graduate education at Tulane University and spent his academic career at Loyola University New Orleans. During that time, he served as a faculty member of the Environmental Studies program, as well as Professor of Philosophy, eventually becoming the Gregory F. Curtin Distinguished Professor in Humane Letters and Professions.

Some of Clark's earliest published works included a critique of Young Hegelian Max Stirner's egoism (1977), as well as The Philosophical Anarchism of William Godwin (1977).

Clark contributed to the editing and translation of the work of anarchist and naturalist Elisée Reclus into English. With Camille Martin, this culminated in A Voyage to New Orleans: Anarchist Impressions of the Old South (2004) and Anarchy, Geography, Modernity: Selected Writings of Elisée Reclus (2005, 2013), for which he also provided commentary.

In 2008, Clark was recognized with the Dux Academicus award as an outstanding member of faculty.

Other recognition includes the Pax Christi New Orleans Bread and Roses Award, Anthony Waters Distinguished Teaching Award, and City College Faculty Award for Excellence in Scholarship.

In 2013, Clark published The Impossible Community: Realizing Communitarian Anarchism, a dialectical contribution to contemporary anarchist theory rooted in but differentiated from the social ecology of Murray Bookchin. A follow-up, titled Between Earth and Empire: From the Necrocene to the Beloved Community was published in 2019.

The John P. Clark Papers are housed in the Special Collections and Archives of the J. Edgar and Louis S. Monroe Library, containing primarily correspondence and publications.

He is a member of the Education Workers' Union of the Industrial Workers of the World.

John Clark is currently the Director of the La Terre Institute for Community and Ecology, which sponsors courses and projects with the aim "at social and ecological regeneration and the creation of a cooperative, non-dominating earth community."

== Activism ==
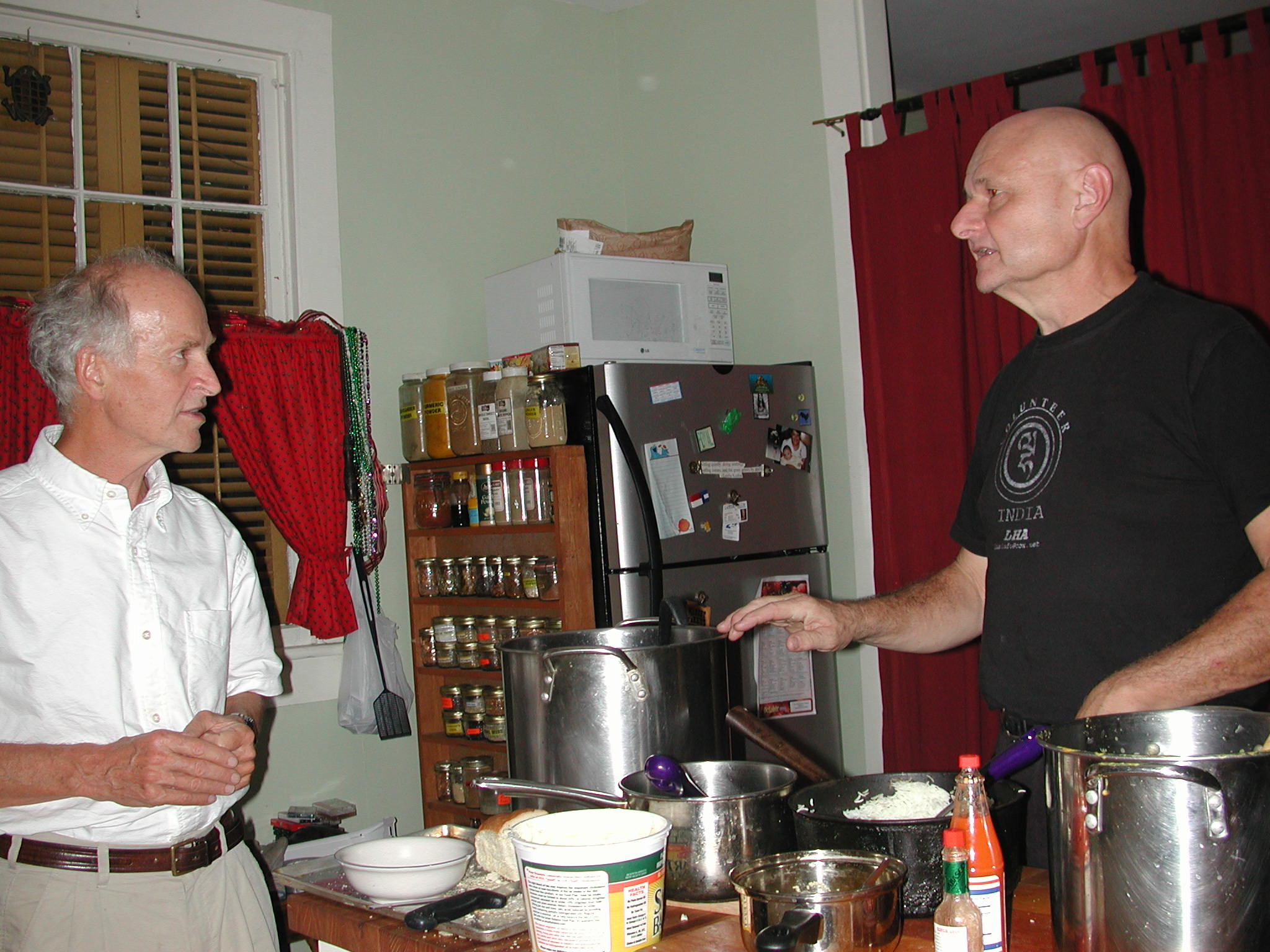
Anarchists John P. Clark (right) and Peter Marshall in conversation

Though splitting ideologically from Bookchin's social ecology in the mid-1990s, Clark began differentiating his approach in 1999 with his essay "The Politics of Social Ecology: Beyond the Limits of the City." He would further differentiate between Bookchin's social ecology and what Clark calls dialectical social ecology with the publication of "Domesticating the Dialectic: A Critique of Bookchin's Neo-Aristotelianism in 2008.

== Selected works ==
- Max Stirner's Egoism (1976)
- The Philosophical Anarchism of William Godwin (1977)
- The Anarchist Moment: Reflections on Culture, Nature and Power (1984)
- The Tragedy of Common Sense (2016)
- Between Earth and Empire: From the Necrocene to the Beloved Community (2019)
- The Impossible Community: Realizing Communitarian Anarchism, 2nd edition (2022)

=== As editor ===
- Renewing the Earth, the Promise of Social Ecology: A Celebration of the Work of Murray Bookchin (1990)
- A Voyage to New Orleans: Anarchist Impressions of the Old South (with Camille Martin) (2004)
- Environmental Philosophy: From Animal Rights to Radical Ecology, 4th edition (Zimmerman, et al.) (2004)
- Anarchy, Geography, Modernity: Selected Writings of Elisée Reclus (with Camille Martin) (2013)

=== As Max Cafard ===
- The Surre(gion)alist Manifesto and Other Writings (2003)
- Zen Anarchy (2006)
- FLOOD BOOK (2008)
- Surregional Explorations (2012)
- Lightning Storm Mind: Pre-Ancientist Meditations (2017)
