= The Philosophical Anarchism of William Godwin =

1977 book by John P. Clark

- Title page for The Philosophical Anarchism of William Godwin (1977)
- Author: John P. Clark
- Subject: Philosophy
- Publisher: Princeton University Press
- Publication date: 1977
- Pages: 343
- ISBN: 9780691072173

The Philosophical Anarchism of William Godwin is a 1977 book by John P. Clark on the philosophy of the moral philosopher and political theorist William Godwin.

== Bibliography ==
- Dickinson, H. T. (1978). "Review of The Philosophical Anarchism of William Godwin". History. 63 (209): 486. ISSN 0018-2648. JSTOR 24410729.
- Kelly, Gary (1979). "Review of The Philosophical Anarchism of William Godwin". Keats-Shelley Journal. 28: 148–150. ISSN 0453-4387. JSTOR 30212848.
- Lemahieu, D. L. (1978). "Review of The Philosophical Anarchism of William Godwin". The American Historical Review. 83 (1): 161–162. doi:10.2307/1865947. ISSN 0002-8762. JSTOR 1865947.
- Nowlin, William G. (1979). "Review of The Philosophical Anarchism of William Godwin". The American Political Science Review. 73 (1): 199–200. doi:10.2307/1954744. ISSN 0003-0554. JSTOR 1954744.
- Scrivener, Michael H. (1978). "Review of The Philosophical Anarchism of William Godwin". Criticism. 20 (1): 98–99. ISSN 0011-1589. JSTOR 23103158.
- Warner, Martin (1979). "Review of The Philosophical Anarchism of William Godwin". The Modern Language Review. 74 (4): 921–925. doi:10.2307/3728250. ISSN 0026-7937. JSTOR 3728250.
- Woodcock, George (April 28, 1978). "The Libertarian Virtues". The Times Literary Supplement: 477. ISSN 0307-661X.
