= List of municipalities on the Great Lakes =

This is a list of municipalities on the Great Lakes, arranged alphabetically by the body of water on which they are located. This list does not include locations officially classified as cities.

== Towns and municipalities located on rivers between two lakes ==
- Detroit, Michigan
- Grosse Ile, Michigan
- Sarnia, Ontario
- Point Edward, Ontario
- Windsor, Ontario

== Lake Erie ==
- Amherstburg, Ontario
- Essex, Ontario
- Kingsville, Ontario
- Leamington, Ontario
- Chatham–Kent, Ontario

== Lake Huron ==
- Collingwood, Ontario
- Killarney, Ontario
- Meaford, Ontario
- Midland, Ontario
- Parry Sound, Ontario
- Penetanguishene, Ontario
- Port McNicoll, Ontario
- Port Severn, Ontario
- Waubaushene, Ontario
- Victoria Harbour, Ontario
- Tobermory, Ontario

== Lake Ontario ==
- Ajax, Ontario
- Whitby, Ontario
- Clarington, Ontario
- Port Hope, Ontario
- Cobourg, Ontario
- Quinte West, Ontario
- Greater Napanee, Ontario

== Lake Superior ==
- Wawa

== See also ==
- List of cities on the Great Lakes
