= Deep Tunnel =

Deep Tunnel may refer to:

- Chicago's Tunnel and Reservoir Plan, commonly known as the Deep Tunnel Project or the Chicago Deep Tunnel
- The Deep Tunnel of Milwaukee Metropolitan Sewerage District
