= Great Lakes Waterway =

System of channels and canals in the Great Lakes

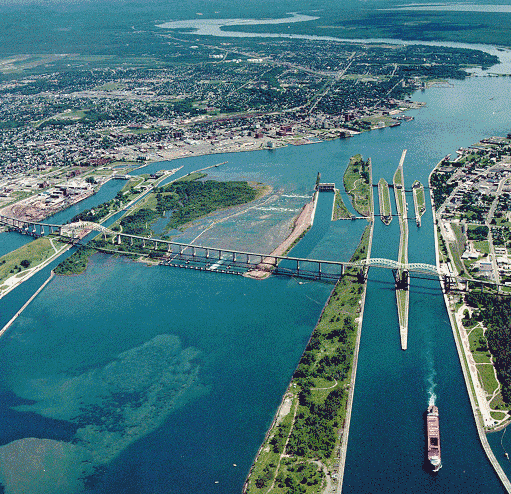
The Soo Locks between Lake Superior and the St. Marys River

The Great Lakes Waterway (GLW) is a system of natural channels and artificial locks and canals that enable navigation between the North American Great Lakes. Although all of the lakes are naturally connected as a chain, water travel between the lakes was impeded for centuries by obstacles such as Niagara Falls and the rapids of the St. Marys River.

Its principal civil engineering works are the Welland Canal between Lakes Ontario and Erie, and the Soo Locks between Huron and Superior. Dredged channels were constructed in the St. Marys River, the Detroit River, Lake St. Clair and the St. Clair River between Huron and Erie. Usually, one or more U.S. Coast Guard icebreakers help keep the water passage open for part of the fall and early winter, although shipping usually ceases for two to three months thereafter. The St. Lawrence Seaway allows navigable shipping from the GLW to the Atlantic Ocean, while the Illinois Waterway extends commercial shipping to the Mississippi River and the Gulf of Mexico. The Great Lakes Waterway is co-administered by the governments of Canada and the United States.

== Description ==
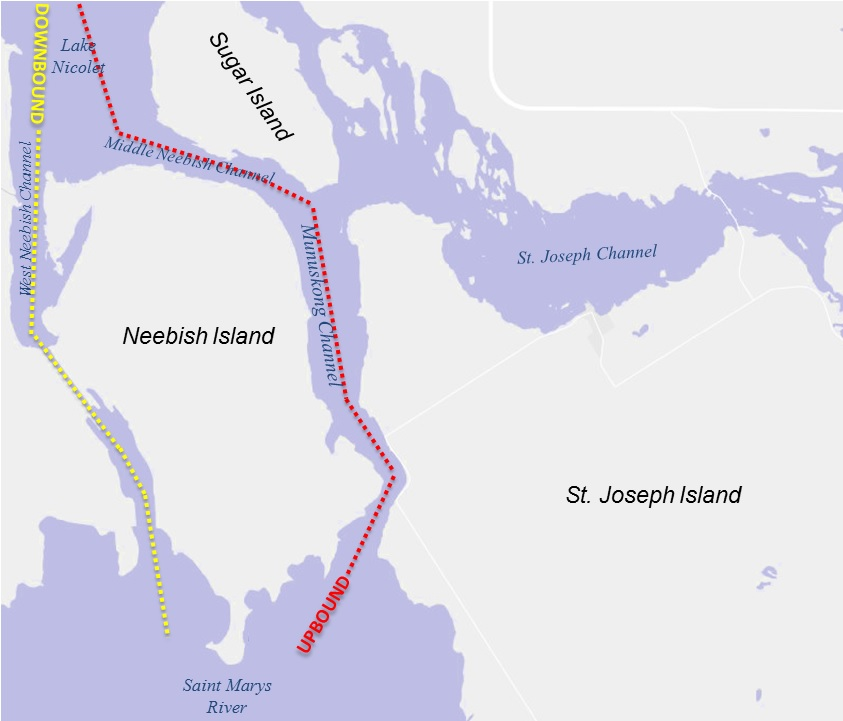
The shipping channels pass on opposite sides of Neebish Island in the St Marys River

The waterway allows passage from the Atlantic Ocean to the inland port of Duluth on Lake Superior, a distance of 2,340 miles (3,770 km) and to Chicago, on Lake Michigan, at 2,250 miles (3,620 km). The elevation change from Lake Superior to sea level is 601 feet (183 m).

Together with the Saint Lawrence Seaway, the Waterway accommodates both ocean-going vessels and ore, grain, and coal-bearing lake freighters that travel from the system's saltwater outlet to its far interior. The Waterway has larger locks and deeper drafts than the lower Seaway, limiting large freighters to the four lakes upstream of the Welland Canal and Lake Ontario and similarly restricting passage beyond Saint Lambert, Quebec by larger ocean vessels. The two waterways are often jointly and simply referred to as the "St. Lawrence Seaway", since the Great Lakes, together with the St. Lawrence River, comprise a single navigable body of freshwater linking the Atlantic Ocean to the continental interior. Major ports on the Great Lakes Waterway include Duluth-Superior, Chicago, Detroit, Toledo, Cleveland, Two Harbors, Hamilton and Thunder Bay.

Shipping channels separate upbound traffic from downbound traffic. The upbound direction is away from the St. Lawrence River (westerly or northerly except in Lake Michigan where upbound is southerly). Channels are marked with navigation buoys in constricted areas and pilots are required on foreign boats. Recreational boats can use or cross the ship channels, but the large boats, with limited maneuverability, have right of way.

== Map ==
Map of the North American Great Lakes and the St. Lawrence Seaway based on a document from 1959, depicting the entire length beginning at the Gulf of Saint Lawrence in the east to the westernmost terminus at Lake Superior.

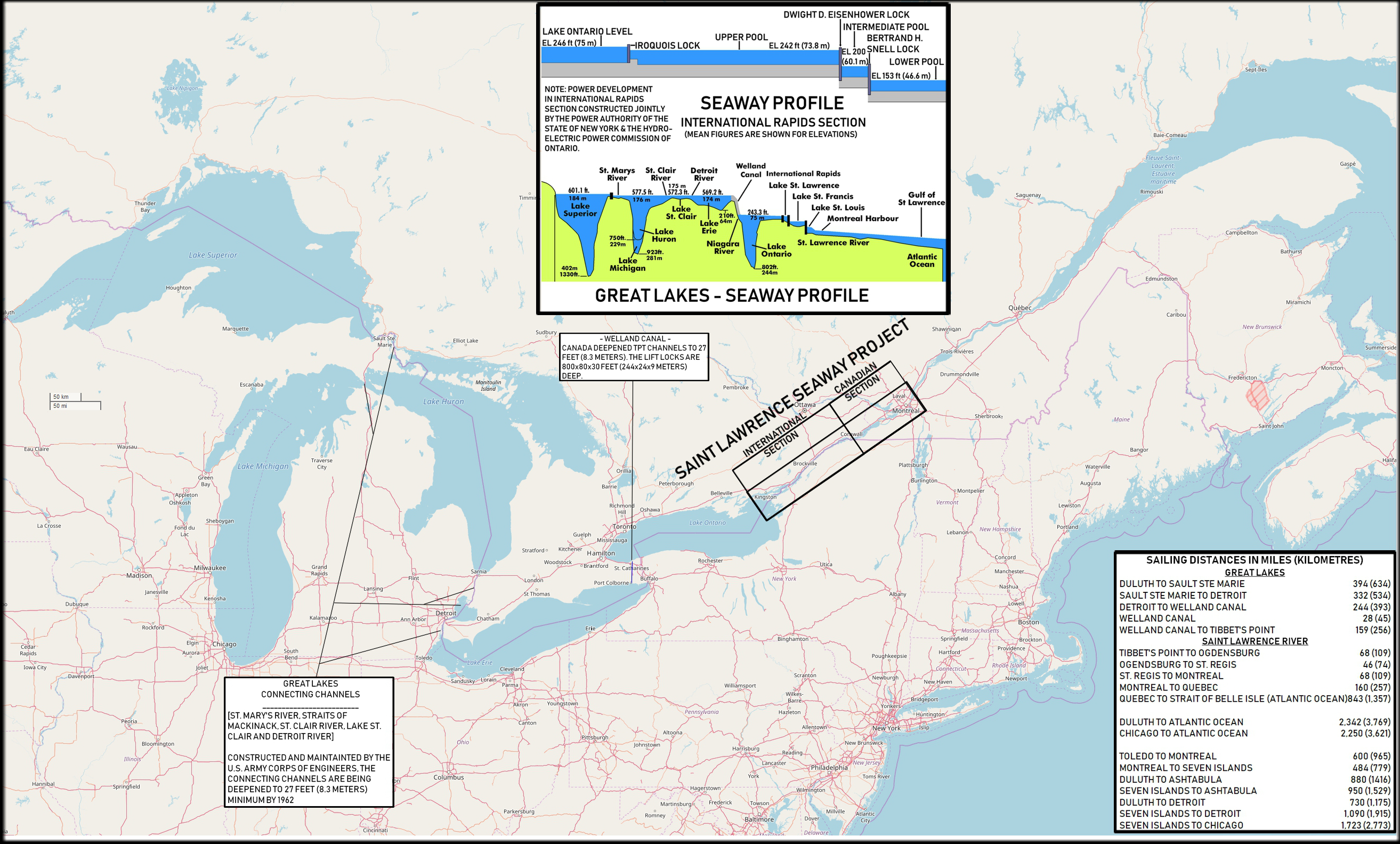

== See also ==
- Straits of Mackinac
