= Camille Martin =

Canadian poet and artist

Camille Martin (born 1956) is a Canadian poet and collage artist. After residing in New Orleans for fourteen years, in 2005 she moved to Toronto following Hurricane Katrina.

== Biography ==
=== Early life and education ===
Camille Martin was born in El Dorado, Arkansas, in 1956 and spent most of her childhood in Lafayette, Louisiana. In 1980, she earned a Master of Music in Piano Performance and Literature from the Eastman School of Music. In 1996, she received a Master of Fine Arts in Poetry from the University of New Orleans. Her thesis, a collection of poems entitled at peril, passed with distinction. In 2003, she received a PhD in English from Louisiana State University. Her dissertation, Radical Dialectics in the Experimental Poetry of Berssenbrugge, Hejinian, Harryman, Weiner, and Scalapino, won the Lewis P. Simpson Distinguished Dissertation Award. She has received grants for poetry from the Louisiana Division of the Arts, the Canada Council for the Arts, the Ontario Arts Council, the Toronto Arts Council, and the League of Canadian Poets.

=== Career ===
Martin is the author of five full-length poetry collections: Blueshift Road (Rogue Embryo Press, 2021),Looms (Shearsman Books, 2012), Sonnets Shearsman Books, 2010), Codes of Public Sleep (Toronto: BookThug, 2007), and Sesame Kiosk (Elmwood, Conn.: Potes & Poets, 2001). She has also published four chapbooks: If Leaf, Then Arpeggio, Rogue Embryo, Magnus Loop, and Plastic Heaven. Her poetry is widely published in journals in the United States, Canada, Australia, and the United Kingdom, and has been translated into Spanish and German.

Martin is also co-editor and co-translator with John P. Clark of two books: Anarchy, Geography, Modernity: The Radical Social Thought of Elisée Reclus (Lanham, JD: Lexington Books, 2004) and A Voyage to New Orleans: Anarchist Impressions of the Old South (Warner, NH: Glad Day Books, 1999, 2004).

From 2006 to 2010, she taught literature and writing at Ryerson University, where she served as an editor for the literary journal White Wall, co-curated the poetry reading series Live Poets Society, and hosted a monthly edition of the literary program In Other Words on CKLN-FM.

Martin regularly writes essays about poetry and the visual arts at her blog, Rogue Embryo. She also maintains a website, CamilleMartin.ca, about her poetry and collage.

== Published works ==
=== Poetry books and chapbooks ===
- Blueshift Road. Toronto: Rogue Embryo Press, 2021.
- Looms. Bristol, U.K.: Shearsman Books, 2012.
- Sonnets. Exeter, U.K.: Shearsman Books, 2010.
- Codes of Public Sleep. Toronto: BookThug, 2007.
- Sesame Kiosk. Elmwood, Conn.: Potes & Poets Press, 2001.
- If Leaf, Then Arpeggio. Ottawa: Above/Ground Press, 2011.
- Magnus Loop. Tucson: Chax Press, 1999.
- Rogue Embryo. New Orleans: Lavender Ink, 1999.
- Plastic Heaven. New Orleans: Single-author issue of Fell Swoop, 1996.

=== Other books ===
- A Voyage to New Orleans: Anarchist Impressions of the Old South (co-translator and co-editor, with John P. Clark). Warner, NH: Glad Day Books, 1999, 2004.
- The Radical Social Thought of Elisée Reclus (co-translator and co-editor, with John P. Clark). Lanham, JD: Lexington Books, 2004.

=== Anthologies ===
- Nine from Sonnets (in Spanish translation). La alteración del silencio: Poesía norteamericana reciente (The Alteration of Silence: Recent North American Poetry). Eds. William Allegrezza and Galo Ghigliotto. Santiago, Chile: Editorial Cuneta, 2010.
- Onsets. The Gig: Toronto, 2004. n.p..
- Another South: Experimental Writing in the South. Tuscaloosa, Ala.: University of Alabama Press, 2002. 133.
- Other Sticky Valentines. Lazy Frog Press, 2002. 6.
- From a Bend in the River. New Orleans: Runagate Press, 1998. 126-27.
- The Maple Leaf Rag: Fifteenth Anniversary Anthology. New Orleans: Portals Press, 1994. 115.
