= Great Lakes Treaty =

Great Lakes Treaty may refer to:

- Rush–Bagot Treaty, a naval disarmament treaty between the United Kingdom and the United States, signed 1817.
- Webster–Ashburton Treaty, a boundary treaty between the United Kingdom and the United States, signed 1842.
- Boundary Waters Treaty of 1909, a boundary and environmental agreement between Canada and the United States.
- Great Lakes Water Quality Agreement, an environmental treaty between the United States and Canada, signed 1972.
- Great Lakes Charter, an environmental agreement between eight US states and two Canadian provinces, signed 1985
- Great Lakes–Saint Lawrence River Basin Sustainable Water Resources Agreement, an environmental agreement between eight US states and two Canadian provinces, signed 2005.
- Great Lakes Compact, an interstate compact among the U.S. states of Illinois, Indiana, Michigan, Minnesota, New York, Ohio, Pennsylvania and Wisconsin, first signed 2007.
