= Northwest Area Water Supply =

The Northwest Area Water Supply (NAWS), is a project to divert water from Lake Sakakawea to the area around Minot, North Dakota, which is in the Souris River watershed. Minot is roughly 40 miles north of Lake Sakakawea.

== Controversy ==
The North Dakota government has stated that the project has received final approval, however the International Joint Commission has not approved any measure related to NAWS.

The Canadian Government has taken issue with the program, as it moves water from the Missouri River basin, which flows south into the United States, to the Souris River basin, which flows north into Canada, possibly introducing foreign microbes into the water supply. Under the Boundary Waters Treaty of 1909, any such interbasin transfers must be approved by the International Joint Commission.

== Funding ==
The other main issue with the NAWS project is funding; federal, state, and local dollars have been pledged to the project, but in summer 2003, federal funds for the project were almost cut, jeopardizing construction.

In 1998, voters in Minot decided to levy a 1% sales tax to go towards the construction of NAWS, but it is not enough to complete the program without federal funding. Further compounding the situation was an illegal diversion of funds from the NAWS tax fund into the city's MAGIC Fund. After a lawsuit was filed against the city, it was ordered to return the misappropriated funds to the NAWS fund, and did so by adding a special assessment on city water bills to raise the funds.

== Construction ==
Despite the lack of international approval, a federal judge has allowed non-treatment portions of the project to proceed. As of 2007, less than a mile of the 36" pipeline is left to go in the ground between Minot and Lake Sakakawea, generally paralleling Highway 83.

If the environmental statement is finished in spring 2008, intake and treatment facilities could be built over the next two years, and water could be piped to Minot in 2010.
