= Great Lakes Protection Fund =

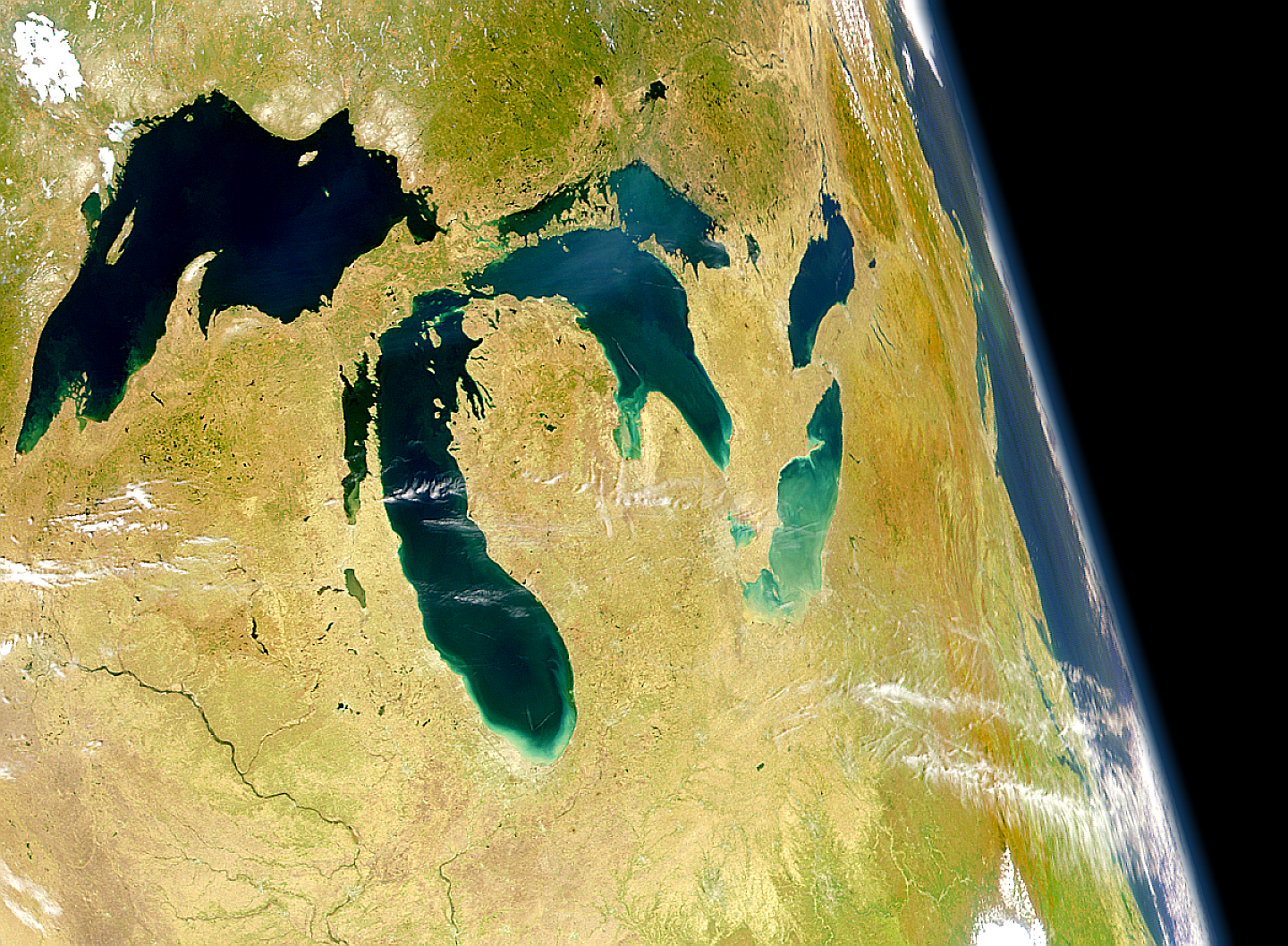
- Image provided by the SeaWiFS Project, NASA / Goddard Space Flight Center and ORBIMAGE
- Abbreviation: GLPF
- Key Positions: Board Chair: Don Ness; Executive Director: David Rankin; Vice President of Programs: Erin McCarville; Governor Chair: Gov. Tim Walz
- Website: www.glpf.org

The Great Lakes Protection Fund is an American publicly capitalized, private corporation created in 1989 by the governors of the U.S. states surrounding the Great Lakes. The Fund invests a one-time contribution of public funds and uses the investment income for two purposes: first, to test new regional actions that improve the health of the Great Lakes; and second, to provide resources for states to support their individual Great Lakes priorities.

== History ==
The governors of seven Great Lakes states signed an official agreement on February 26, 1989, to create the Great Lakes Protection Fund. This followed recommendations made in the 1986 Toxic Substances Control Agreement, signed by the Great Lakes governors. Seven Great Lakes states contributed $81,000,000 to capitalize the Fund. Each state contributed to the Fund based on its usage of Great Lakes water. The Great Lakes Research Consortium hailed the Fund as a "unique and precedent-setting conclusion to the search for a stable, long-term funding mechanism for Great Lakes research." The Great Lakes Protection Fund held its first meeting on July 12, 1989, in Chicago.

The earnings from the endowment, now worth over $175 million, have supported 324 regional projects, committing $110 million to regional project teams. The Fund has also provided $60 million of additional support directly to its member states for their discretionary uses.

The Fund is prohibited from expending the publicly funded endowment, and does not undertake the work of government nor the compliance activities required of private parties. During the Fund's formation, the International Association for Great Lakes Research and Great Lakes United cautioned that the Fund should not be considered a replacement for state and federal investments in environmental protection. Rather, the Fund is meant to "enhance state and federal projects while preserving water quality more effectively."

== Organization and governance ==
The Fund is a membership corporation. The governors of those states that have paid their share of the initial capital are members ex officio. Currently, the states of Minnesota, Wisconsin, Illinois, Michigan, Ohio, New York, and the Commonwealth of Pennsylvania are members in good standing. Member Governors each elect two directors who act as fiduciaries for the corporation. The governors are required to select individuals with regional perspective and seek a board of directors that is fully reflective of "the diverse community of State and regional interests (such as academics, environmentalists, business, labor, local communities and others) that use and benefit from the Great Lakes." Under the stewardship of member governors—who set the broad parameters of the Fund's multi-year goals—directors set priorities, hire staff, invest the endowment, and make project finance decisions.

Governor Chair	Gov. Tim Walz
Chair of Board	Don Ness
Executive Director	J. David Rankin
Vice President of Programs	Erin McCarville
Vice President of Finance and Administration	Sharon Walton
Incorporated	1989
Member State Contributions Completed	1998
Rate of Return (Since Inception)	7.7%
Total Grants & Program-related Investments	324

== Funding and Impact ==
By January 2026, the Fund has supported 324 regional projects, investing $110 million in grants and loans. Fund-supported project teams have:

- Designed, installed and tested the world's first ballast water filtration system on a working vessel;
- Developed and demonstrated the first set of protocols to evaluate the effectiveness of ballast water treatment—on ship, on the shore, and in the lab;
- Developed, verified, and used the first set of methods to evaluate "hatch-out" of organisms that remain in ballast tanks after water is discharged;
- Designed and deployed the first remote monitoring technologies to track water levels, pumping activity, and water chemistry in ballast tanks while ships are underway;
- Supported the design, development and launch of 38 local environmental grant-making programs that leveraged Fund support 15-fold by raising nearly $10 million in funds for coastal community foundations in all Great Lakes states and the Province of Ontario;
- Restored more natural flows in over 1500 miles of basin rivers through collaborative re-operation of more than 100 hydroelectric facilities;
- Pioneered new ways to finance, facilitate and evaluate the removal of more than a dozen dams in rivers that feed the lakes;
- Designed, deployed and evaluated the first series of two-stage drainage ditches to restore natural flows and riparian cover in agricultural landscapes;
- Created and deployed a series of planning and assurance tools—including whole farm planning, nutrient yardsticks, rotational grazing guidance, and Best Management Practice warranties—used by hundreds of farms to remove sediment and nutrients from basin waters;
- Designed, deployed, evaluated and exported a water quality trading system that removed nutrients from the Great Lakes and became the basis for the national strategy on water quality trading;
- Deployed the first rain barrels in an urban setting in the United States, beginning a movement that continues to grow in the basin and beyond;
- Developed and tested modeling frameworks and measurement tools that track/estimate/predict how changed water uses lead to improved hydrological and biological conditions;
- Created and sustained the forum for the design and development of what became the Great Lakes St. Lawrence River Basin Water Resources Compact and associated Regional Agreement, providing over $1 million for expert advice, travel support and staff time;
- Developed the criteria for sustainably managed forest lands, certifying over 700,000 acres in New York state, and leading to certification of over 10,000,000 acres in basin states, adding to previously certified lands in Minnesota and Pennsylvania, protecting the lakes with improved land management;
- Designed, launched and sustained the Great Printers' Project removing volatile organic compounds from the region's air, well in advance of regulatory requirements.

These efforts were supported in response to proposals generated in response to the Fund's guidelines, periodic supplemental requests for proposals, or assembled collaboratively with Fund staff. That work involved over 1000 collaborating institutions and thousands of team members. The Fund welcomes preproposals—short descriptions of potential new projects—at any time.

== See also ==
- Great Lakes Compact
- Council of Great Lakes Governors
- Great Lakes Commission
- Great Lakes Areas of Concern
- Clean Water Act
- List of cities along the Great Lakes
