= David Rankin =

David Rankin may refer to:

- David Rankin (American football) (1919–2006), American football player
- David Rankin (artist) (born 1946), New York-based Australian artist
- David Rankin (astronomer) (born 1984), American astronomer and fossil hunter
- David Rankin (cricketer) (born 1987), Irish cricketer
- David Rankin (footballer) (born 1960), former Australian rules footballer
- David Nevin Rankin (1834–1900), physician
- David John Rankin (1903–1959), Scottish-Canadian politician
- J. David Rankin, Director of the Great Lakes Protection Fund
