= Great Lakes Commission =

North American interstate agency

Members Associate members

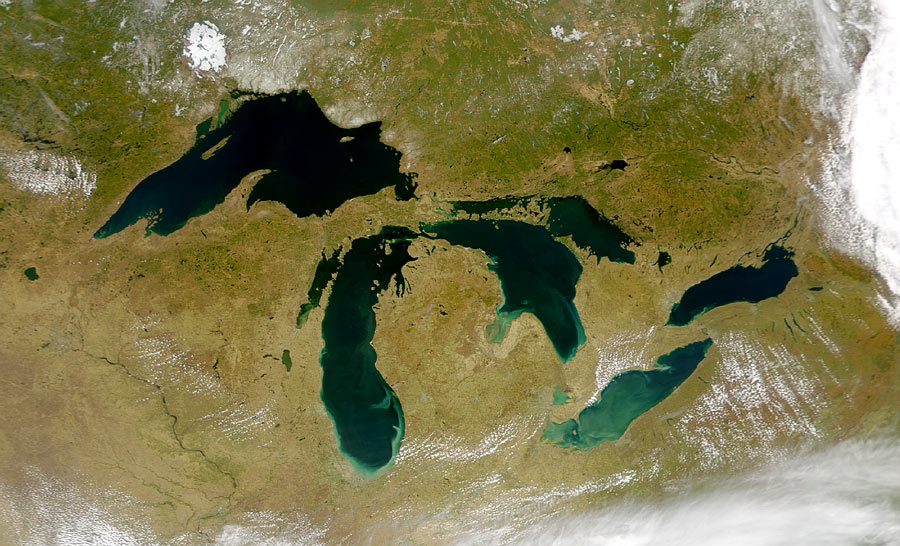
The Great Lakes from space.

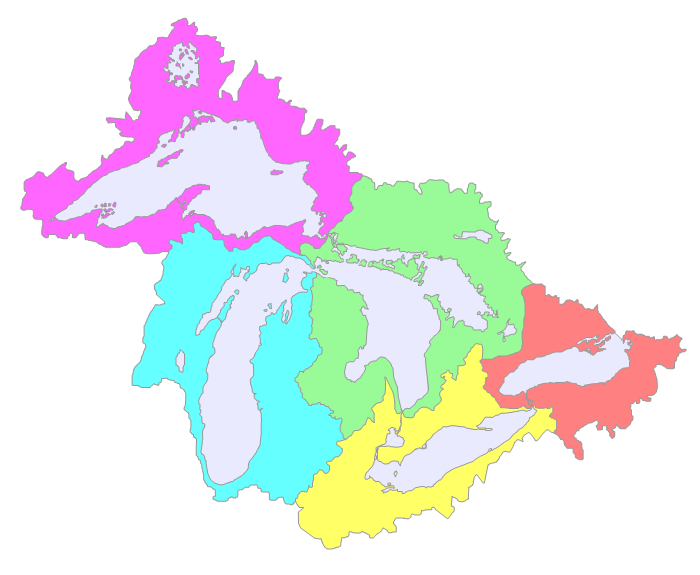
A map of the Great Lakes Basin showing the five sub-basins within. Left to right, they are: Superior (magenta); Michigan (cyan); Huron (pale green); Erie (yellow); Ontario (light coral).

The Great Lakes Commission is a United States interstate agency established in 1955 through the Great Lakes Basin Compact, to "promote the orderly, integrated and comprehensive development, use and conservation of the water resources of the Great Lakes Basin," which includes the Saint Lawrence River. The Great Lakes Commission provides policy development, coordination, and advocacy on regional issues, as well as communication and research services.

The eight member states are Illinois, Indiana, Michigan, Minnesota, New York, Ohio, Pennsylvania, and Wisconsin. The Canadian provinces of Ontario and Quebec are associate members. Each state has three votes on matters coming before the commission, while associate members and observers (representing the United States and Canadian federal governments, tribes, and other regional organizations) are permitted to participate in discussions, deliberations and other activities as approved by the commission but have no vote.

There is a separate and distinct entity with a similar brief, the International Joint Commission, which exists between the federal levels of the United States and Canada.

== See also ==
- Great Lakes and St. Lawrence Governors and Premiers
- Great Lakes
- Great Lakes Basin
- Great Lakes Compact
- Great Lakes–Saint Lawrence River Basin Sustainable Water Resources Agreement
- Great Lakes Circle Tour
- International Joint Commission
