= Great Lakes (disambiguation) =

The Great Lakes are a collection of five large lakes in the Northeastern United States and Southeastern Canada.

Great Lakes or Great Lake may also refer to:

- Great Lakes region, the area near the Great Lakes in the United States and Canada

== Lakes ==
- African Great Lakes, a collection of lakes in and around the Great Rift Valley in eastern Africa
- Great Lake (Tasmania), a lake in Australia
- Perth Wetlands or Great Lakes District, in Perth, Western Australia
- Tonlé Sap or Great Lake, a lake in Cambodia
- Great Lake, a lake on the River Poulter in Nottinghamshire, UK

=== Fictional ===
- The Great Lake, a minor place in Arda in J. R. R. Tolkien's Middle-earth

== Military ==
- Naval Station Great Lakes, a United States Navy base
- USS Great Lakes, a planned destroyer tender of the United States Navy that was cancelled in 1946

== Music ==
- Great Lakes (band), a project of the Elephant Six Collective
- The Great Lakes (album), an album by Emm Gryner

== Transportation ==
- Great Lakes Airlines, a United States regional airline based in Denver, Colorado
- Great Lakes Aircraft Company, manufacturer of the 2T-1A Sport Trainer biplane
- Great Lakes station, a railway station in North Chicago, Illinois, United States

== Other uses ==
- Great Lakes Brewery (Toronto)
- Great Lakes Brewing Company
- Great Lakes Chemical Corporation, an American company, now part of Chemtura Corporation
- Great Lakes Council, a former local government area in New South Wales, Australia
- Great Lakes Higher Education Corporation, a lending body that specializes in educational loans
- Great Lakes Institute of Management, based in Chennai, India
- Great Lakes tectonic zone

== See also ==
- Great Lakes Commission, North American agency
- Great Lakes Compact
- Great Lakes Depression, a depression that contains the Great Lakes of Mongolia
- Great Lakes Megalopolis
- Iowa Great Lakes, a collection of lakes in Dickinson County, Iowa, US
