= MAGIC Fund (disambiguation) =

MAGIC Fund may refer to the following:

- MAGIC Fund (Minnesota), a cash services and investment fund for county governments in the state of Minnesota
- MAGIC Fund (Minot), an economic development fund in Minot, North Dakota
