= Inland Sea =

Inland Sea may refer to:

- Inland sea, a sea that covers a central area of a landmass
- specific inland seas named "Inland Sea":
  - Seto Inland Sea, the body of water separating three of the main islands of Japan
  - Inland Sea, a section of the Cymyran Strait between Anglesey and Holy Island, Wales
  - Inland Sea, Gozo, a lagoon of seawater on the island of Gozo in Malta
  - Western Inland Sea, also known as the Western Interior Seaway, a sea that split the continent of North America during the Cretaceous Period
  - Khor Al Adaid, an inlet of the Persian Gulf
- Inland Sea, an album by Rin'
- Inland Sea, a book by Donald Richie
  - The Inland Sea, a film based on Richie's book directed by Lucille Carra
- The Pathfinder, or The Inland Sea, an 1840 novel by James Fenimore Cooper

== See also ==
- Closed sea
- Operation Inland Seas, a United States Navy operation in the Saint Lawrence Seaway in 1959
- Great Lakes (disambiguation)
- Caspian Sea, a body of water in central Asia classed as either an inland sea or as the world's largest lake
- Salton Sea, a shallow, saline, endorheic rift lake located directly on the San Andreas Fault, predominantly in California's Imperial and Coachella Valleys.
