= Great Lakes megalopolis =

Cities around the Great Lakes of North America

Coordinates: 41°N 85°W

- Megaregion of the United States and Canada
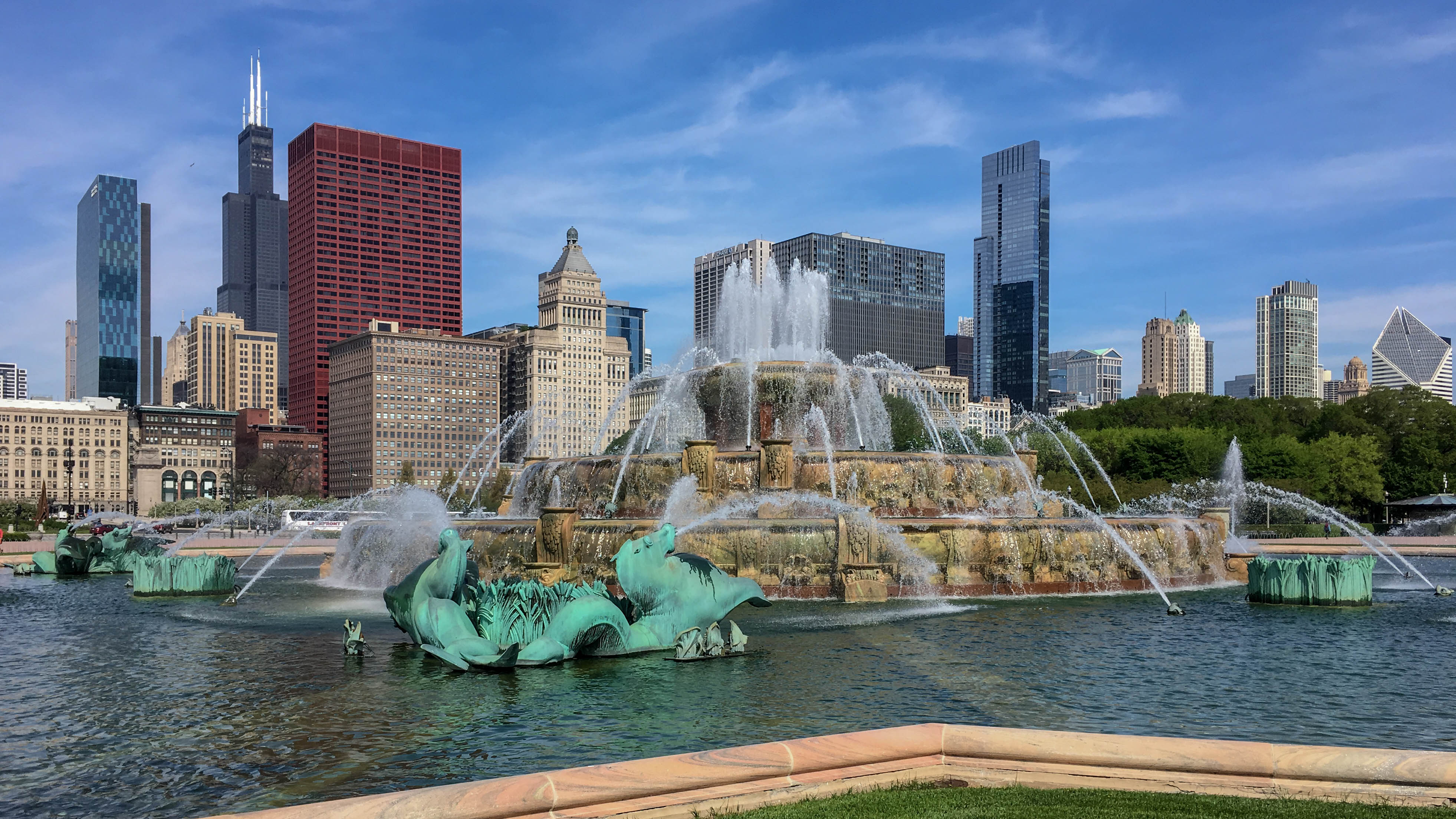
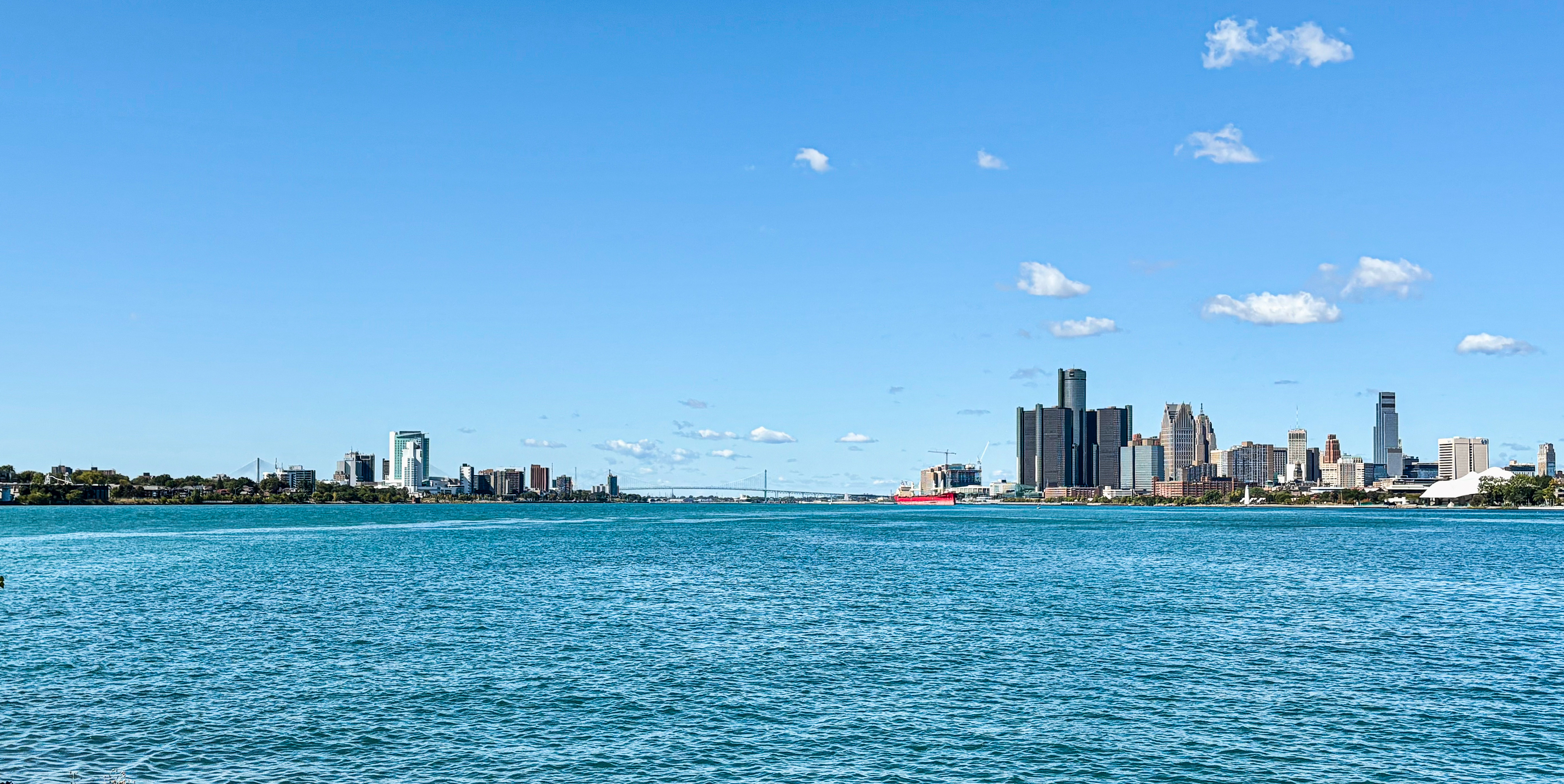
- Largest metropolitan areas of the Great Lakes megaregion (from top to bottom): Chicago, Toronto, Detroit–Windsor
Interactive Map of the Great Lakes Megaregion
Large metropolitan areas (population 1,000,000+)
Chicago–Naperville, IL–IN–WI CSA
Milwaukee–Racine–Waukesha, WI CSA
St. Louis–St. Charles–Farmington, MO–IL
Grand Rapids–Wyoming, MI CSA
Detroit–Warren–Ann Arbor, MI CSA
Cleveland–Akron–Canton, OH CSA
Pittsburgh–New Castle–Weirton, PA CSA
Buffalo–Niagara Falls, NY CSA
Rochester–Batavia–Seneca Falls, NY CSA
Indianapolis–Carmel–Muncie, IN CSA
Columbus–Marion–Zanesville, OH CSA
Cincinnati–Wilmington, OH–KY–IN CSA
Dayton–Springfield–Kettering, OH CSA
Louisville/Jefferson County, KY–IN CSA
Minneapolis–St. Paul, MN–WI CSA
Kansas City, MO–KS CSA
Toronto, Ont. CMA
Metro and micro areas (less than 1,000,000)
Non-metropolitan counties in the megaregion
- Countries: United States; Canada
- States: Illinois; Ohio; Michigan; Pennsylvania; New York; Indiana; Wisconsin; Minnesota; Missouri; Kentucky; Iowa
- Provinces: Ontario; Quebec
- Largest city: Toronto (2,794,356)
- Largest metropolitan area: Chicago metropolitan area (9,812,676)

Population
  - Total: 59,100,000

The Great Lakes megalopolis consists of a bi-national group of metropolitan areas in North America largely in the Great Lakes region. It extends from the Midwestern United States, and part of the Southern United States in the south and west to western Pennsylvania and Western New York in the Northeastern United States and northward through Southern Ontario into southwestern Quebec in Canada. It is the most populated and largest megalopolis in North America.

At its most inclusive, in the United States the region cuts a wide swath from the Twin Cities of Minneapolis–Saint Paul in Minnesota in the west, south to St. Louis and Louisville, Kentucky, and east to Rochester, New York; in Canada, it continues northeasterly to Quebec City. This broader region had an estimated population of 59,144,461 as of 2011 and is projected to reach a population of about 65 million by 2025. Within this broad region, there is a core area of more continual urban development that includes Chicago, Milwaukee, Grand Rapids, Indianapolis, Detroit–Windsor, Cincinnati, Columbus, Cleveland, Toledo, Pittsburgh, Buffalo, Rochester, Toronto, Ottawa, Montreal, and the metropolitan areas between these.

== History of the concept ==
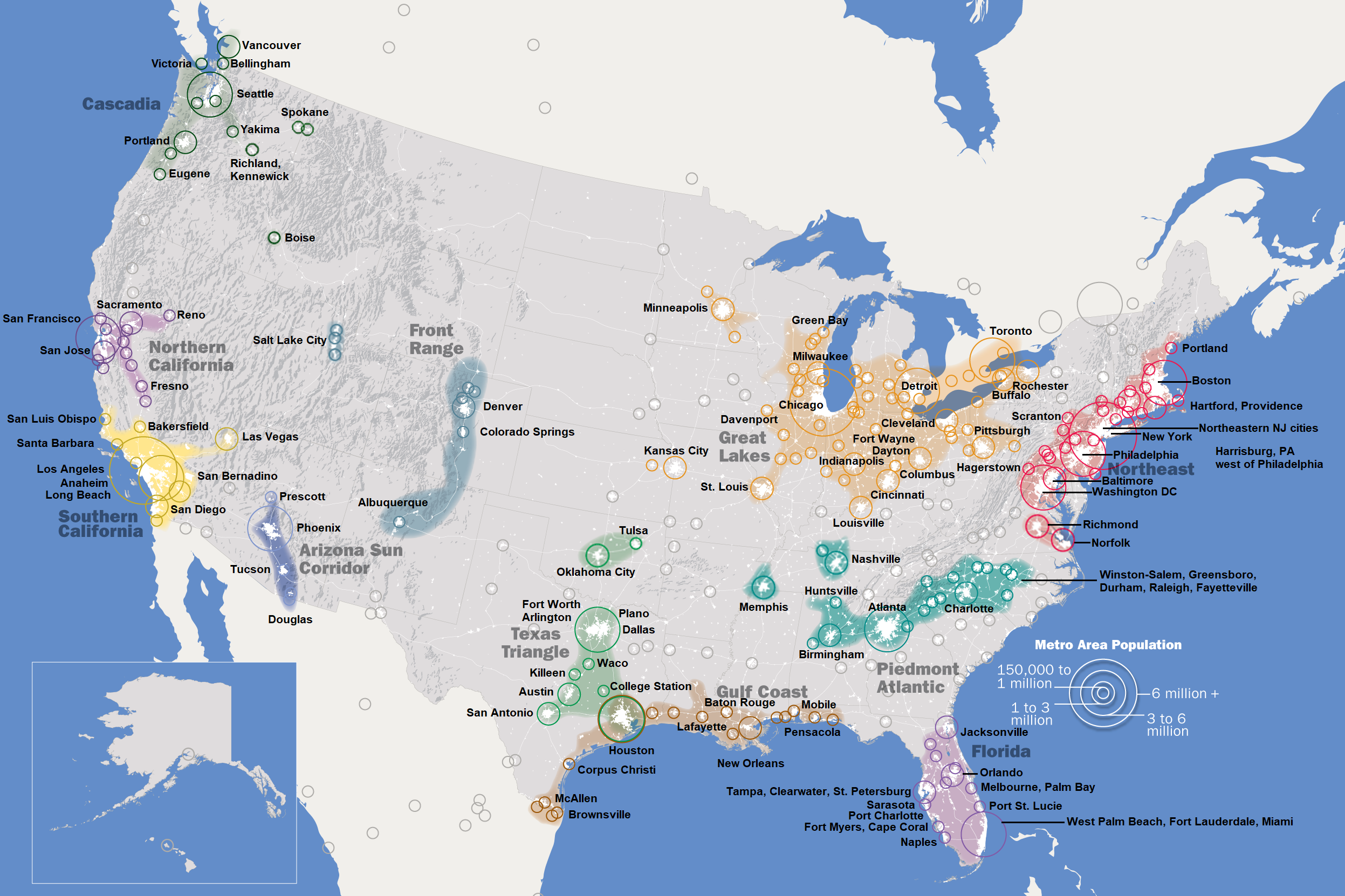
Map of the emerging American-Canadian megaregions as defined by America 2050. This interpretation excludes the eastern part of the Windsor–Quebec City urban corridor from the Great Lakes Megalopolis.

The region was partially outlined as an emergent megalopolis in the 1961 book Megalopolis: The Urbanized Northeastern Seaboard of the United States by French geographer Jean Gottmann. Gottmann envisaged the development of other megalopolises in the U.S.: from Boston to Washington, D.C., from Chicago to Pittsburgh, and from San Francisco to San Diego.

In 1965, futurist Herman Kahn speculated about the three megalopolises in the year 2000. In the 1960s and 1970s, urban planner and architect Constantinos Doxiadis wrote books, studies, and reports about the growth potential of the Great Lakes Megalopolis. Doxiadis envisioned Detroit (on the U.S.–Canada border across from Windsor) as the central urban area in this megalopolis, which he defined as extending "from Milwaukee and Chicago to Detroit, Pittsburgh and Buffalo and into Canada from Windsor to Montreal and Quebec".

In 2005, the Virginia Tech Metropolitan Institute's Beyond Megalopolis, an attempt to update Gottmann's work, outlined a similar "Midwest" megapolitan area as one of ten such areas in the United States (Canada is discussed tangentially). Over 200 million tons of cargo are shipped annually through the Great Lakes. The America 2050 project identified 11 Megaregions of the United States, including the Great Lakes Megalopolis.^{[A]} The Canadian part of the region is also referred to as the Quebec City–Windsor Corridor, and the densest part in Southern Ontario has long been known as the Golden Horseshoe.

== Governments ==
There are multiple government jurisdictions throughout the megalopolis. In addition to the federal governments of the United States and Canada, there are multiple U.S. states and two Canadian province jurisdictions, and many county and local governments. Most of the states have joined the provinces in forming the Conference of Great Lakes and St. Lawrence Governors and Premiers to coordinate economic and environmental strategies throughout most of the region.

== Economy ==
The five Great Lakes contain one-fifth of the world's surface fresh water and have a combined shoreline of 10,210 miles (17,017 km). About 200 million tons of cargo are shipped through the Great Lakes each year.

The Great Lakes Cruising Coalition supports passenger ship cruises through a joint U.S-Canadian venture to Great Lakes Ports and the Saint Lawrence Seaway.

== Education ==
The Great Lakes Megalopolis is home to many prestigious institutions of higher education. Two founding members of the Association of American Universities (AAU), the University of Chicago in Chicago, Illinois, and the University of Michigan in Ann Arbor, Michigan, are located in the region. The University of Chicago and Northwestern University in the Chicago area are two high-ranking world universities. Other major universities include the University of Toronto in Toronto, Ontario; McGill University in Montreal, Quebec; McMaster University in Hamilton, Ontario; University of Waterloo in Waterloo, Ontario, Ohio State University in Columbus, Ohio; Carnegie Mellon University and University of Pittsburgh in Pittsburgh, Pennsylvania; Case Western Reserve University in Cleveland, Ohio; University of Rochester in Rochester, New York, University of Louisville in Louisville, Kentucky; Washington University in St. Louis in St. Louis, Missouri; and the University of Notre Dame in Notre Dame, Indiana.

The region also contains large multi-campus state university systems such as the University of Illinois System, University of Minnesota System, University of Missouri System, University of Wisconsin System, the University System of Ohio, the State University of New York (SUNY) System, the Indiana University System, and the Purdue University System. It also contains some universities in the Université du Québec system, such as UQAM in Montreal.

== Major land and marine transportation corridors ==
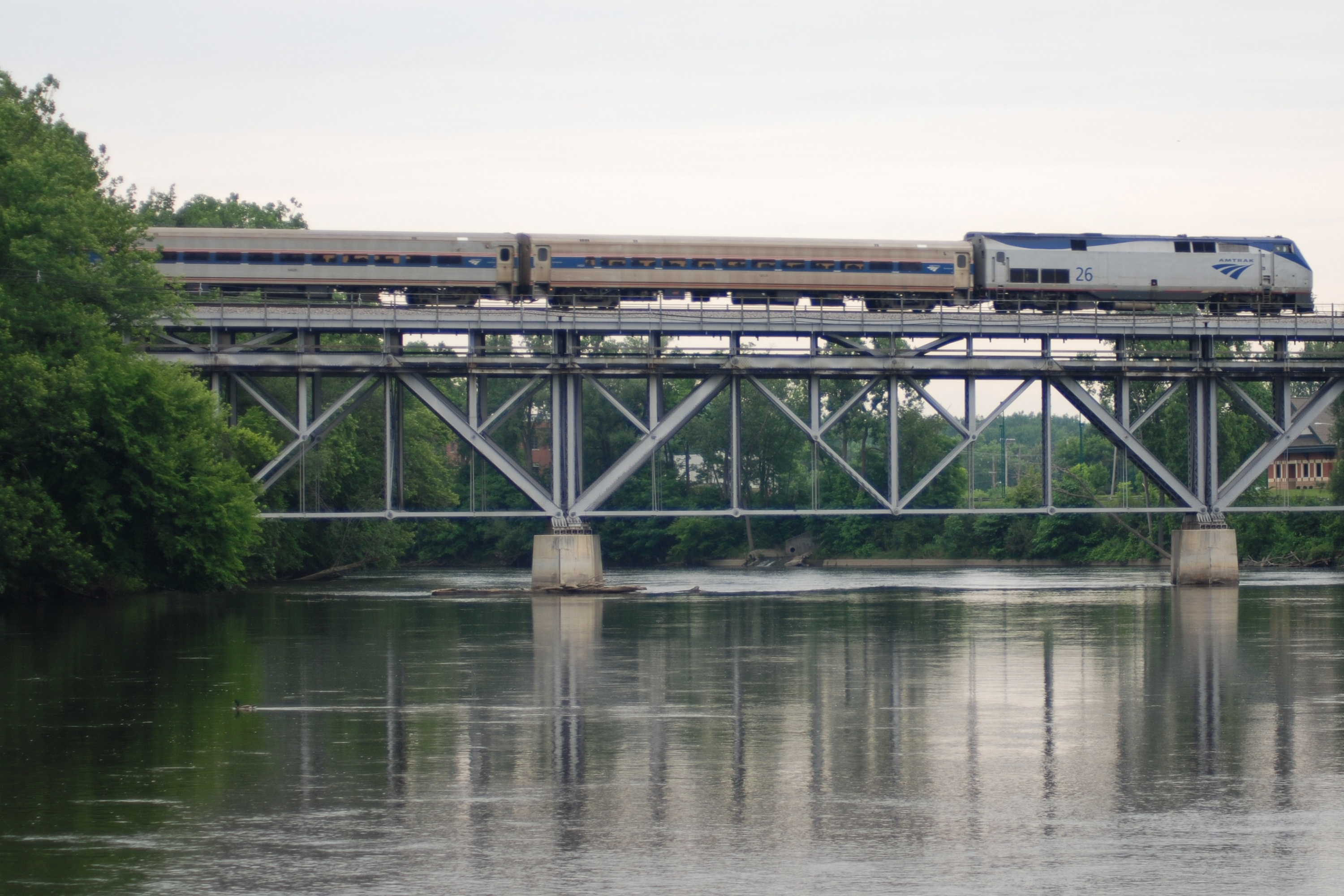
Amtrak Wolverine crossing St. Joseph River

The Great Lakes Megalopolis includes the following major inter-urban corridors that are provided with freeway and passenger rail service in both the core and fringe areas of the mega-region. Major waterways for shipping and cruising are also indicated where applicable. Amtrak in the United States and Via Rail in Canada offer rail passenger service, while most Class I freight rail services also connect these points. Major rail shipping services in both Canada and the United States is provided on tracks owned by Canadian National Railway and Canadian Pacific Railway.

=== Chicago-Milwaukee-Minneapolis/St. Paul ===
This corridor occupies the northwestern fringe of the megalopolis. It occupies northern Illinois, southern Wisconsin, and parts of eastern Minnesota. Interstate 94 and Amtrak's Empire Builder and Borealis trains run roughly parallel from Chicago to Minneapolis/St. Paul by way of Milwaukee and Madison, Wisconsin. The Chicago-Milwaukee segment is served by Amtrak Hiawatha and runs seven times per day.

=== Chicago-St. Louis ===
Interstate 55, Amtrak's Lincoln Service, and the Illinois Waterway connect Chicago to St. Louis.

=== Chicago-Indianapolis-Cincinnati ===
Interstate 65 extends from the Chicago area southeast to Indianapolis, where Interstate 74 travels through to Cincinnati. Amtrak runs regular service along this same route via the Cardinal.

=== Chicago-Buffalo-Rochester ===
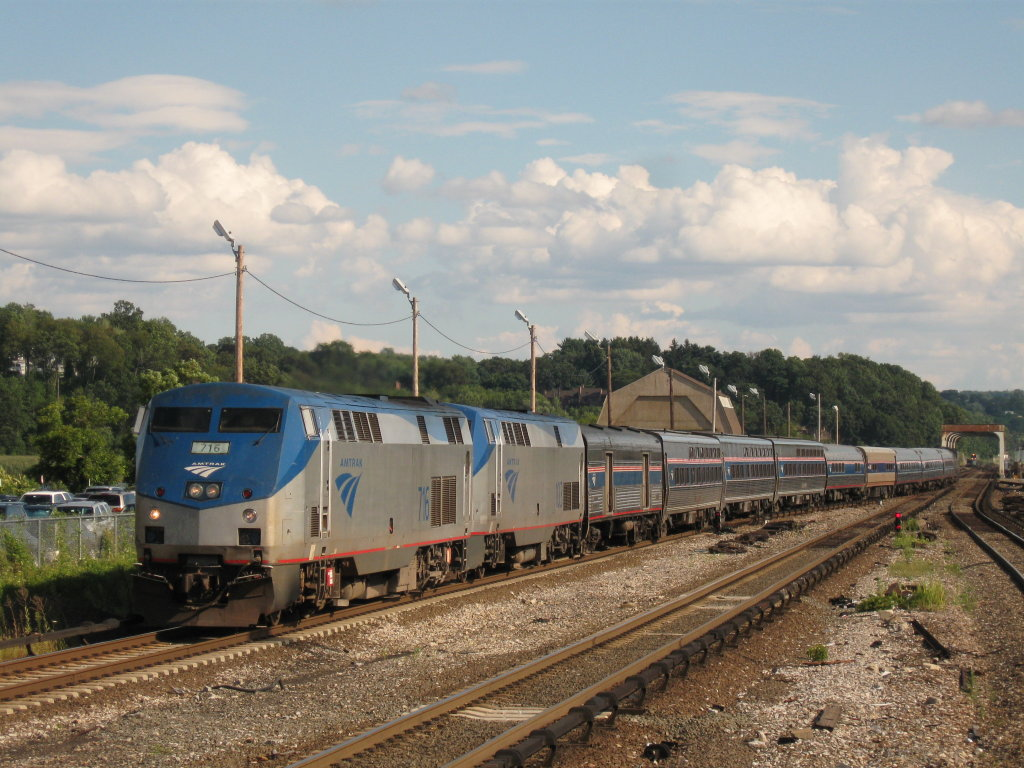
Lake Shore Limited

Interstate 90 and Amtrak's Lake Shore Limited run approximately parallel through the core area of the megalopolis from Chicago to Cleveland via South Bend, Indiana, and Toledo, Ohio, then into the eastern fringe area comprising Buffalo and Rochester, New York. Amtrak's Floridian provides a passenger rail link from Cleveland to Pittsburgh which is roughly paralleled by Interstate 76. The main water route deviates well to the north of the land route from Chicago to Detroit. It runs north along Lake Michigan, east through the Straits of Mackinac, then south along Lake Huron, the St. Clair River, and Lake St Clair to the Detroit River. From this point, the water route roughly parallels the land route to Rochester by way of Lake Erie, the Welland Canal, and Lake Ontario.

=== Detroit-Chicago ===
Interstate 94 takes a more northerly route than I-90 through the megalopolis core area east of Chicago. It extends from that city to the west end of the Windsor-Quebec City Corridor by way of Kalamazoo, Ann Arbor, Detroit, and Port Huron, Michigan/Sarnia, Ontario. This interstate freeway also parallels Amtrak's Wolverine and Blue Water. The main water route is the same as for the western part of the Chicago-Rochester water corridor from Lake Michigan to the Detroit River. Amtrak also serves this route with the Wolverine service, between Chicago and Pontiac via Ann Arbor and Detroit.

=== Windsor–Quebec City ===
The Windsor–Quebec City Corridor lies along the northeastern fringe of the Great Lakes megalopolis. The entire Canadian section of the broader megaregion is sometimes considered a separate megalopolis. Key freeways include Highway 401 and Highway 417 in Ontario which connect with Autoroute 20 and Autoroute 40 respectively in Quebec. Highway 416 and Autoroute 50 link the National Capital Region with Highway 401 and the Montreal area respectively, but the two freeways do not link directly with each other across the Ontario–Quebec border. Passenger rail service is provided in both provinces by the Via Rail Corridor Service. Intermediate points along the corridor include London, Kitchener, Hamilton, St. Catharines, Toronto, Kingston, Ottawa, and Montreal. The main water shipping route is the same as for the eastern part of the Chicago-Rochester corridor, starting at the Detroit River but continuing east beyond Lake Ontario along the St. Lawrence Seaway to Quebec City and the Gulf of St. Lawrence.

== Secondary land or marine transportation corridors ==
Several corridors have interstate highways but no comprehensive passenger rail service. These highway routes pass through both core and fringe areas of the Great Lakes megalopolis. The upper Great lakes region has a marine corridor that connects Lakes Superior, Huron, and Michigan. However, this route does not include parallel Amtrak passenger rail or interstate highway service.

=== Kansas City–Pittsburgh ===
Interstate 70 follows the southern fringe of the megaregion. It runs from Kansas City to just south of Pittsburgh by way of St. Louis, Indianapolis, Dayton, Ohio, and Columbus, Ohio.

=== Detroit–Grand Rapids ===
Interstate 96 serves traffic between the Detroit and Grand Rapids metro areas. The route passes through Lansing on the way and extends to Muskegon to the northwest of Grand Rapids.

=== Evansville–Port Huron ===
Interstate 69 extends from Evansville to the west end of the Windsor-Quebec City Corridor, crossing the border into Canada and becoming Ontario Highway 402, which eventually leads to Highway 401. Intermediate points include Indianapolis, Fort Wayne, Indiana, Lansing, Flint, and Port Huron, Michigan/Sarnia, Ontario.

=== Cincinnati–Saginaw ===
Interstate 75 runs from Saginaw, Michigan, to Cincinnati by way of Flint and Detroit in Michigan, and Toledo, Lima, and Dayton in Ohio.

=== Duluth–Lake Huron ===
The waterway connecting Duluth, Minnesota, and western Lake Superior to points east and south includes the Soo Locks connecting to Lake Huron, then south to Port Huron MI/Sarnia ON or through the Straits of Mackinac to the metropolitan areas around Lake Michigan.

== Selected American and Canadian population centers ==
Largest cities (not metropolitan areas or census divisions) in the Great Lakes megalopolis with populations over 100,000
2020 rank	City	Region	2020/21 censuses (Note: The census population for Canadian cities uses their 2021 census population.)	2010/11 censuses (Note: The census population for Canadian cities uses their 2011 census population.)	Change	Land area	2020 population density
1	Toronto	Ontario	2,794,356	2,615,060	+6.86%	243.3 sq mi (630.1 km^{2})	11,468/sq mi (4,428/km^{2})
2	Chicago	Illinois	2,746,388	2,695,598	+1.88%	227.3 sq mi (588.7 km^{2})	12,059/sq mi (4,656/km^{2})
3	Montréal	Quebec	1,762,949	1,649,519	+6.88%	166.6 sq mi (431.5 km^{2})	12,505/sq mi (4,828/km^{2})
4	Ottawa	Ontario	1,017,449	883,391	+15.18%	1,077.3 sq mi (2,790.2 km^{2})	950/sq mi (370/km^{2})
5	Columbus	Ohio	905,748	787,033	+15.08%	226.3 sq mi (586.1 km^{2})	4,110/sq mi (1,590/km^{2})
6	Indianapolis	Indiana	887,642	820,445	+8.19%	361.6 sq mi (936.5 km^{2})	2,455/sq mi (948/km^{2})
7	Mississauga	Ontario	717,961	713,443	+0.63%	112.9 sq mi (292.4 km^{2})	6,391/sq mi (2,468/km^{2})
8	Brampton	Ontario	656,480	523,911	+25.30%	102.3 sq mi (265 km^{2})	6,390/sq mi (2,470/km^{2})
9	Detroit	Michigan	639,111	713,777	−10.46%	138.7 sq mi (359.2 km^{2})	4,067/sq mi (1,570/km^{2})
10	Louisville	Kentucky	633,045	597,337	+5.98%	325.0 sq mi (841.7 km^{2})	1,900/sq mi (730/km^{2})
11	Milwaukee	Wisconsin	577,222	594,833	−2.96%	96.2 sq mi (249.2 km^{2})	6,001/sq mi (2,317/km^{2})
12	Hamilton	Ontario	569,353	519,949	+9.50%	431.8 sq mi (1,118.4 km^{2})	1,319/sq mi (509/km^{2})
13	Quebec City	Quebec	549,459	516,622	+6.36%	175.1 sq mi (453.5 km^{2})	3,039/sq mi (1,173/km^{2})
14	Kansas City	Missouri	508,090	459,787	+10.51%	314.7 sq mi (815 km^{2})	1,614/sq mi (623/km^{2})
15	Laval	Quebec	438,366	401,553	+9.17%	95.5 sq mi (247.3 km^{2})	4,431/sq mi (1,711/km^{2})
16	Minneapolis	Minnesota	429,954	382,578	+12.38%	54 sq mi (140 km^{2})	7,692/sq mi (2,970/km^{2})
17	London	Ontario	422,324	366,151	+15.34%	162.4 sq mi (420.6 km^{2})	2,365/sq mi (913/km^{2})
18	Cleveland	Ohio	372,624	396,815	−6.10%	77.7 sq mi (201.2 km^{2})	4,794/sq mi (1,851/km^{2})
19	Markham	Ontario	338,503	301,709	+12.20%	81.4 sq mi (211 km^{2})	4,156/sq mi (1,605/km^{2})
20	Vaughan	Ontario	323,103	288,301	+12.07%	105.2 sq mi (272.5 km^{2})	3,071/sq mi (1,186/km^{2})
21	Saint Paul	Minnesota	311,527	285,068	+9.28%	52 sq mi (135 km^{2})	5,994/sq mi (2,314/km^{2})
22	Cincinnati	Ohio	309,317	296,493	+4.33%	77.9 sq mi (201.8 km^{2})	3,970/sq mi (1,530/km^{2})
23	Pittsburgh	Pennsylvania	302,971	305,704	−0.89%	55.4 sq mi (143.5 km^{2})	5,471/sq mi (2,112/km^{2})
24	St. Louis	Missouri	301,578	310,294	−2.81%	61.7 sq mi (160 km^{2})	4,886/sq mi (1,886/km^{2})
25	Gatineau	Quebec	291,041	265,349	+9.68%	132.4 sq mi (342.9 km^{2})	2,004/sq mi (774/km^{2})
26	Buffalo	New York	278,349	261,310	+6.52%	40.4 sq mi (104.6 km^{2})	6,893/sq mi (2,661/km^{2})
27	Toledo	Ohio	270,871	287,208	−5.69%	80.5 sq mi (208.5 km^{2})	3,365/sq mi (1,299/km^{2})
28	Madison	Wisconsin	269,840	233,309	+15.66%	79.6 sq mi (206 km^{2})	3,391/sq mi (1,309/km^{2})
29	Fort Wayne	Indiana	263,886	253,691	+4.02%	110.6 sq mi (286.5 km^{2})	2,400/sq mi (930/km^{2})
30	Kitchener	Ontario	256,885	219,153	+17.22%	52.8 sq mi (136.8 km^{2})	4,900/sq mi (1,900/km^{2})
31	Longueuil	Quebec	254,483	231,409	+9.97%	44.6 sq mi (115.5 km^{2})	5,185/sq mi (2,002/km^{2})
32	Windsor	Ontario	229,660	210,891	+8.90%	56.5 sq mi (146.3 km^{2})	4,065/sq mi (1,570/km^{2})
33	Oakville	Ontario	213,759	182,520	+17.12%	53.7 sq mi (139.1 km^{2})	3,985/sq mi (1,539/km^{2})
34	Rochester	New York	211,328	210,565	+0.36%	35.8 sq mi (92.7 km^{2})	5,909/sq mi (2,281/km^{2})
35	Richmond Hill	Ontario	202,022	185,541	+8.88%	38.9 sq mi (101 km^{2})	5,191/sq mi (2,004/km^{2})
36	Grand Rapids	Michigan	198,917	188,040	+5.78%	44.8 sq mi (116.0 km^{2})	4,442/sq mi (1,715/km^{2})
37	Overland Park	Kansas	197,238	173,372	+13.77%	75.2 sq mi (194.8 km^{2})	2,600/sq mi (1,000/km^{2})
38	Akron	Ohio	190,469	199,110	−4.34%	61.9 sq mi (160 km^{2})	3,075/sq mi (1,187/km^{2})
39	Burlington	Ontario	183,314	175,779	+4.29%	71.7 sq mi (185.7 km^{2})	2,452/sq mi (947/km^{2})
40	Aurora	Illinois	180,542	197,899	−8.77%	45 sq mi (116.5 km^{2})	4,015/sq mi (1,550/km^{2})
41	Oshawa	Ontario	175,383	149,607	+17.23%	56.3 sq mi (145.8 km^{2})	2,660/sq mi (1,030/km^{2})
42	Kansas City	Kansas	156,607	145,786	+7.42%	124.7 sq mi (323.0 km^{2})	1,200/sq mi (460/km^{2})
43	Joliet	Illinois	150,362	147,433	+1.99%	65.1 sq mi (168.6 km^{2})	2,310/sq mi (890/km^{2})
44	Lévis	Quebec	149,683	137,218	+9.08%	173.4 sq mi (449.1 km^{2})	827/sq mi (319/km^{2})
45	Naperville	Illinois	149,540	141,853	+5.42%	39.1 sq mi (101.3 km^{2})	3,824/sq mi (1,476/km^{2})
46	Rockford	Illinois	148,655	152,871	−2.76%	64.9 sq mi (168.1 km^{2})	2,290/sq mi (880/km^{2})
47	Guelph	Ontario	143,740	121,688	+18.12%	33.7 sq mi (87.3 km^{2})	4,258/sq mi (1,644/km^{2})
48	Olathe	Kansas	141,290	125,872	+12.25%	61.6 sq mi (159.5 km^{2})	2,300/sq mi (890/km^{2})
49	Warren	Michigan	139,387	134,056	+3.98%	34.4 sq mi (89.1 km^{2})	4,055/sq mi (1,566/km^{2})
50	Trois-Rivières	Quebec	139,163	129,886	+7.14%	111.7 sq mi (289.3 km^{2})	1,203/sq mi (464/km^{2})
51	Whitby	Ontario	138,501	122,022	+13.50%	56.6 sq mi (146.6 km^{2})	2,445/sq mi (944/km^{2})
52	Cambridge	Ontario	138,479	126,748	+9.26%	43.6 sq mi (112.9 km^{2})	3,174/sq mi (1,225/km^{2})
53	Dayton	Ohio	137,644	141,527	−2.74%	55.8 sq mi (144.5 km^{2})	2,466/sq mi (952/km^{2})
54	St. Catharines	Ontario	136,803	131,400	+4.11%	37.1 sq mi (96.1 km^{2})	3,587/sq mi (1,385/km^{2})
55	Sterling Heights	Michigan	134,386	129,699	+3.61%	36.5 sq mi (94.5 km^{2})	3,686/sq mi (1,423/km^{2})
56	Milton	Ontario	132,979	84,362	+57.63%	140.2 sq mi (363.1 km^{2})	948/sq mi (366/km^{2})
57	Kingston	Ontario	132,485	123,363	+7.39%	174.2 sq mi (451.2 km^{2})	736/sq mi (284/km^{2})
58	Ajax	Ontario	126,666	109,600	+15.57%	25.7 sq mi (66.6 km^{2})	4,233/sq mi (1,634/km^{2})
59	Ann Arbor	Michigan	123,851	113,934	+8.70%	28.2 sq mi (73.0 km^{2})	4,388/sq mi (1,694/km^{2})
60	Independence	Missouri	123,011	116,830	+5.29%	78 sq mi (202.0 km^{2})	1,578/sq mi (609/km^{2})
61	Waterloo	Ontario	121,436	98,780	+22.94%	24.7 sq mi (64.0 km^{2})	4,910/sq mi (1,900/km^{2})
62	Rochester	Minnesota	121,395	106,796	+13.67%	55.6 sq mi (144.0 km^{2})	2,184/sq mi (843/km^{2})
63	Evansville	Indiana	118,414	117,429	+0.84%	47.4 sq mi (122.8 km^{2})	2,477/sq mi (956/km^{2})
64	Elgin	Illinois	114,797	108,188	+6.11%	38 sq mi (98.4 km^{2})	3,019/sq mi (1,166/km^{2})
65	Springfield	Illinois	114,394	116,250	−1.60%	61.2 sq mi (158.5 km^{2})	1,870/sq mi (720/km^{2})
66	Peoria	Illinois	113,150	115,007	−1.61%	48 sq mi (124.3 km^{2})	2,359/sq mi (911/km^{2})
67	Lansing	Michigan	112,644	114,297	−1.45%	39.1 sq mi (101.3 km^{2})	2,878/sq mi (1,111/km^{2})
68	Dearborn	Michigan	109,976	98,153	+12.05%	24.3 sq mi (62.9 km^{2})	1,751/sq mi (676/km^{2})
69	Green Bay	Wisconsin	107,395	104,057	+3.21%	45.5 sq mi (117.8 km^{2})	2,299/sq mi (888/km^{2})
70	Brantford	Ontario	104,688	93,650	+11.79%	38.1 sq mi (98.7 km^{2})	2,748/sq mi (1,061/km^{2})
71	Chatham-Kent	Ontario	103,988	103,671	+0.31%	949 sq mi (2,458 km^{2})	107/sq mi (41/km^{2})
72	South Bend	Indiana	103,453	101,168	+2.26%	42 sq mi (108.8 km^{2})	2,465/sq mi (952/km^{2})
73	Davenport	Iowa	101,724	99,685	+2.05%	63.8 sq mi (165.2 km^{2})	1,595/sq mi (616/km^{2})
74	Lee's Summit	Missouri	101,108	91,364	+10.67%	63.9 sq mi (165.5 km^{2})	1,582/sq mi (611/km^{2})
75	Clinton Township	Michigan	100,513	96,796	+3.84%	281 sq mi (727.8 km^{2})	3,445/sq mi (1,330/km^{2})

== See also ==
- Megalopolis (city type)
- Conference of Great Lakes and St. Lawrence Governors and Premiers
- Megaregions of the United States
- Great Lakes
- Quebec City – Windsor Corridor
- Conurbation
- Combined Statistical Area
- Census Metropolitan Area
- Rust Belt

== Notes ==
A. ^ ^{a} Various sources include Quebec City, Montreal and Ottawa in the Great Lakes Megalopolis, while excluding Minneapolis–Saint Paul, Kansas City, Cincinnati, Indianapolis, Louisville, and Columbus. All these partial-consensus and non-consensus cities lie at the eastern, western, and southern fringes of the megalopolis.

== Gallery ==
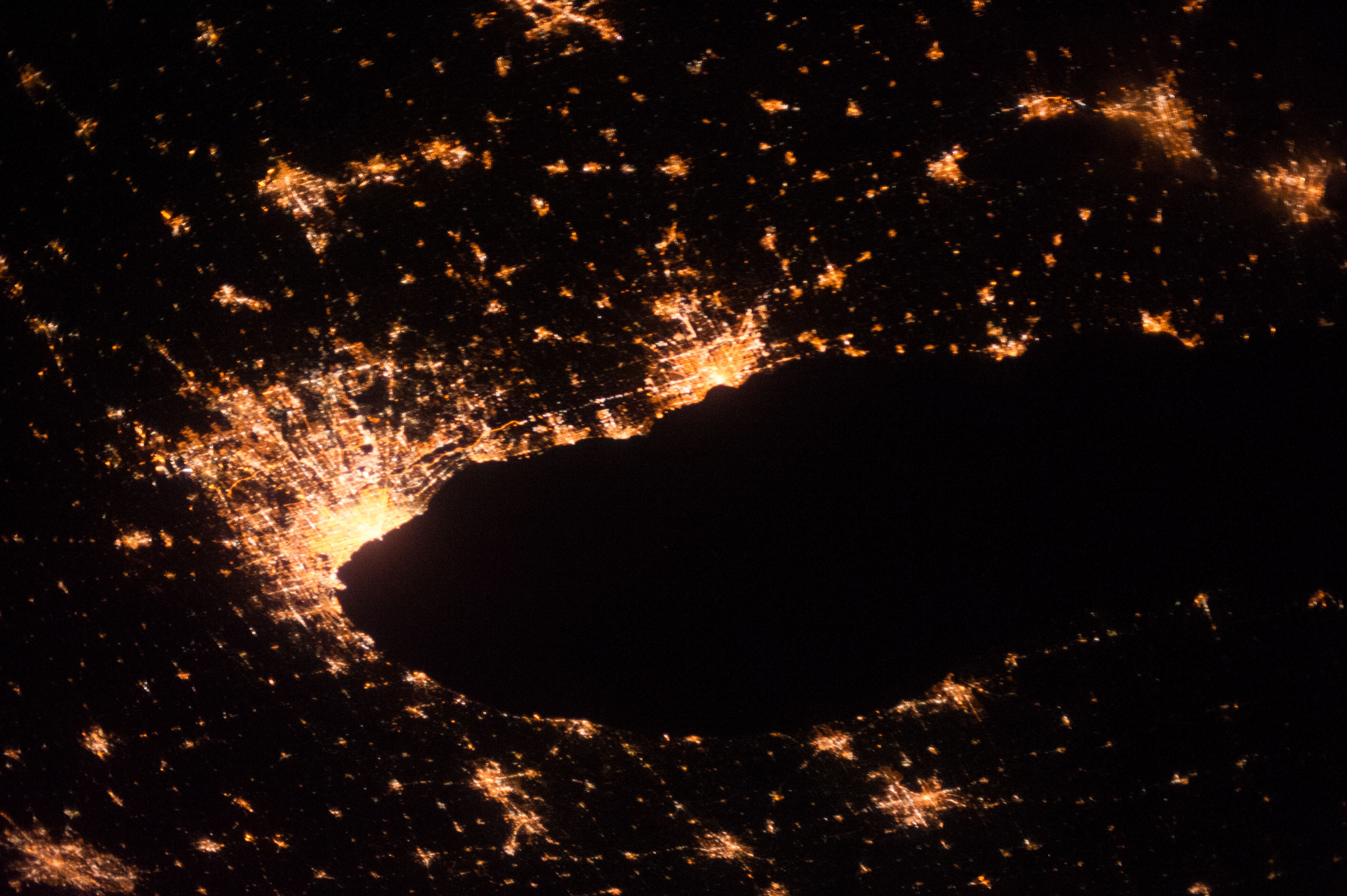
Chicago (left) and Milwaukee (center)

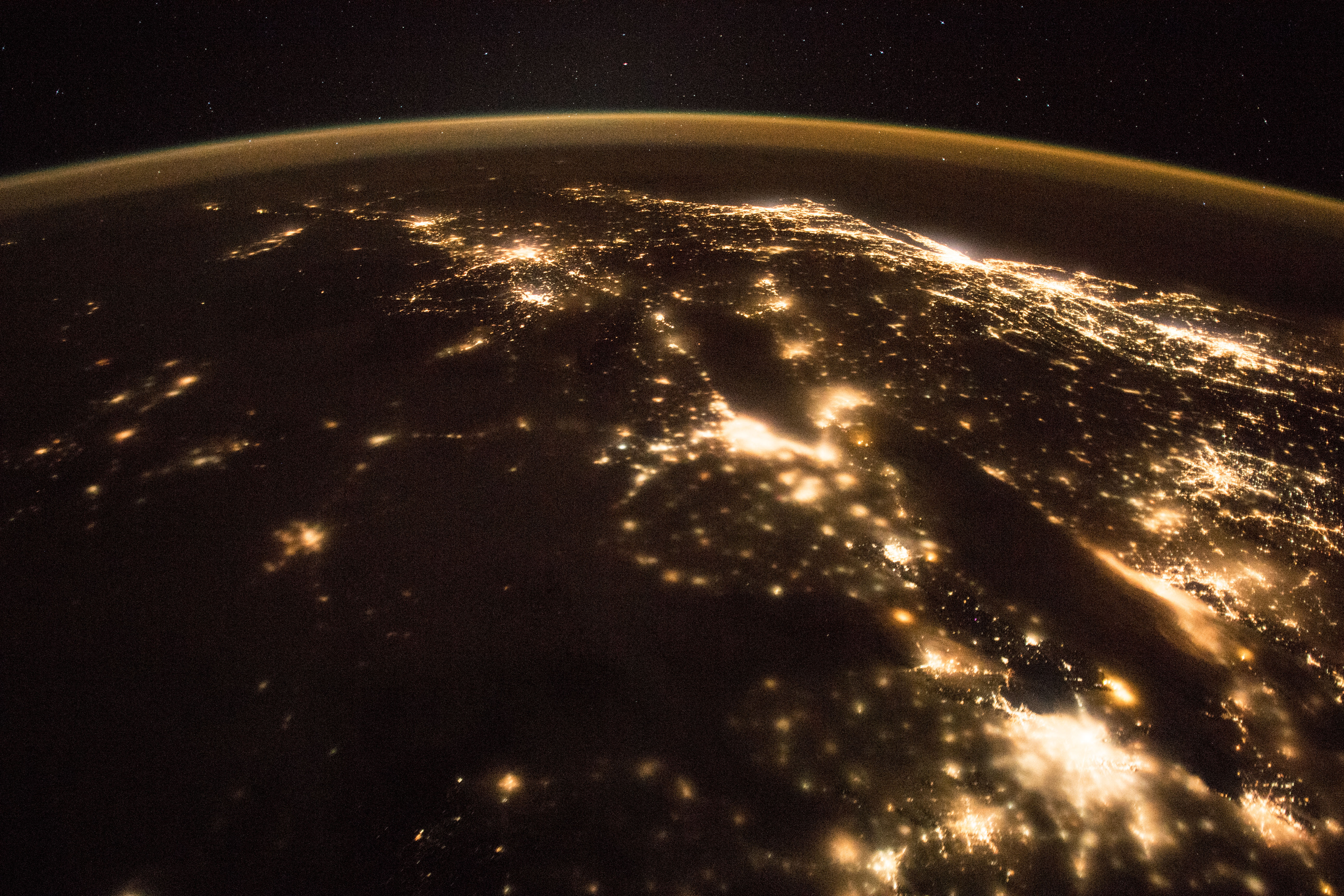
Lakes Erie (right) and Ontario (left)

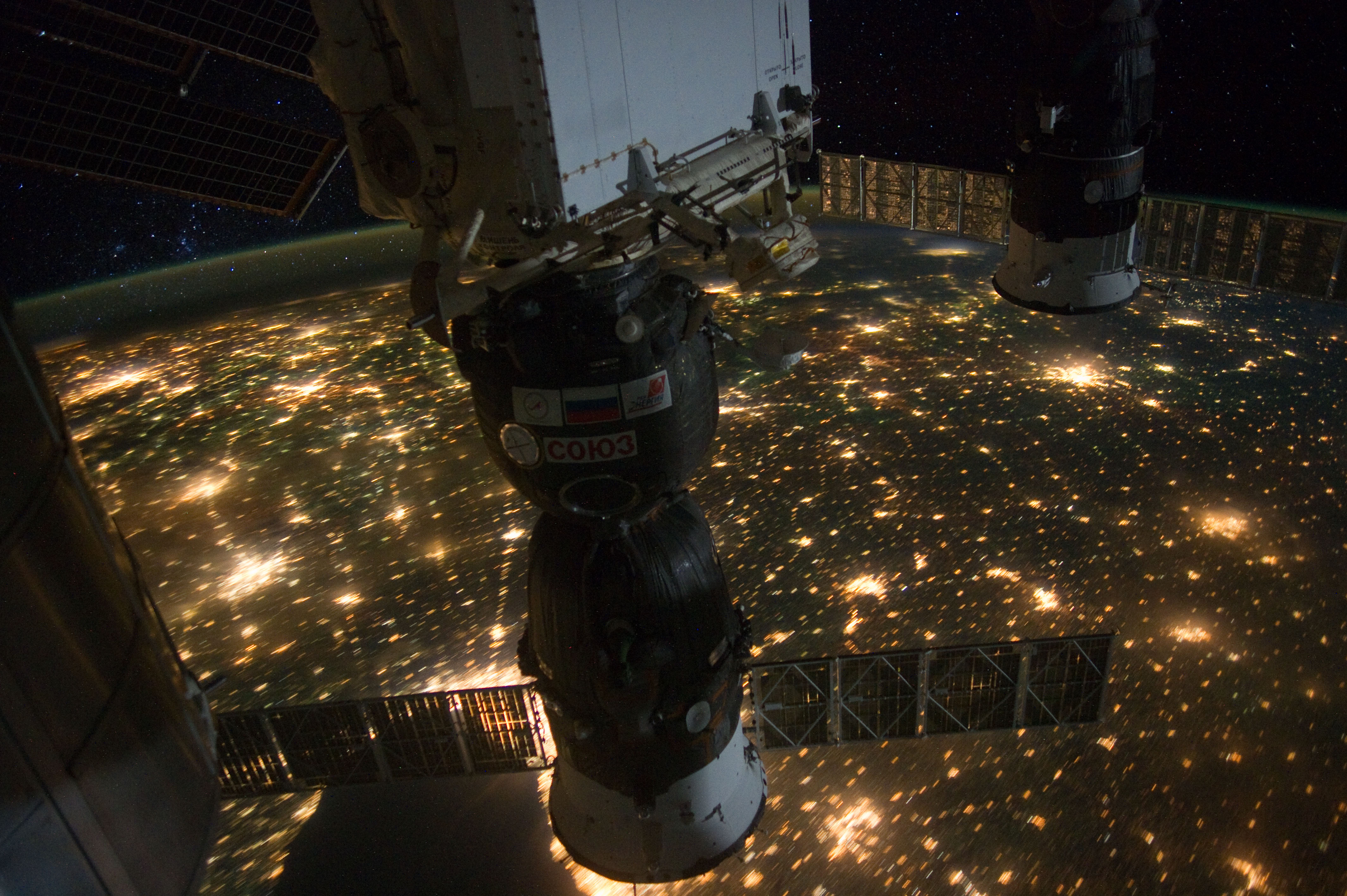
Indianapolis (left) to St. Louis (right)

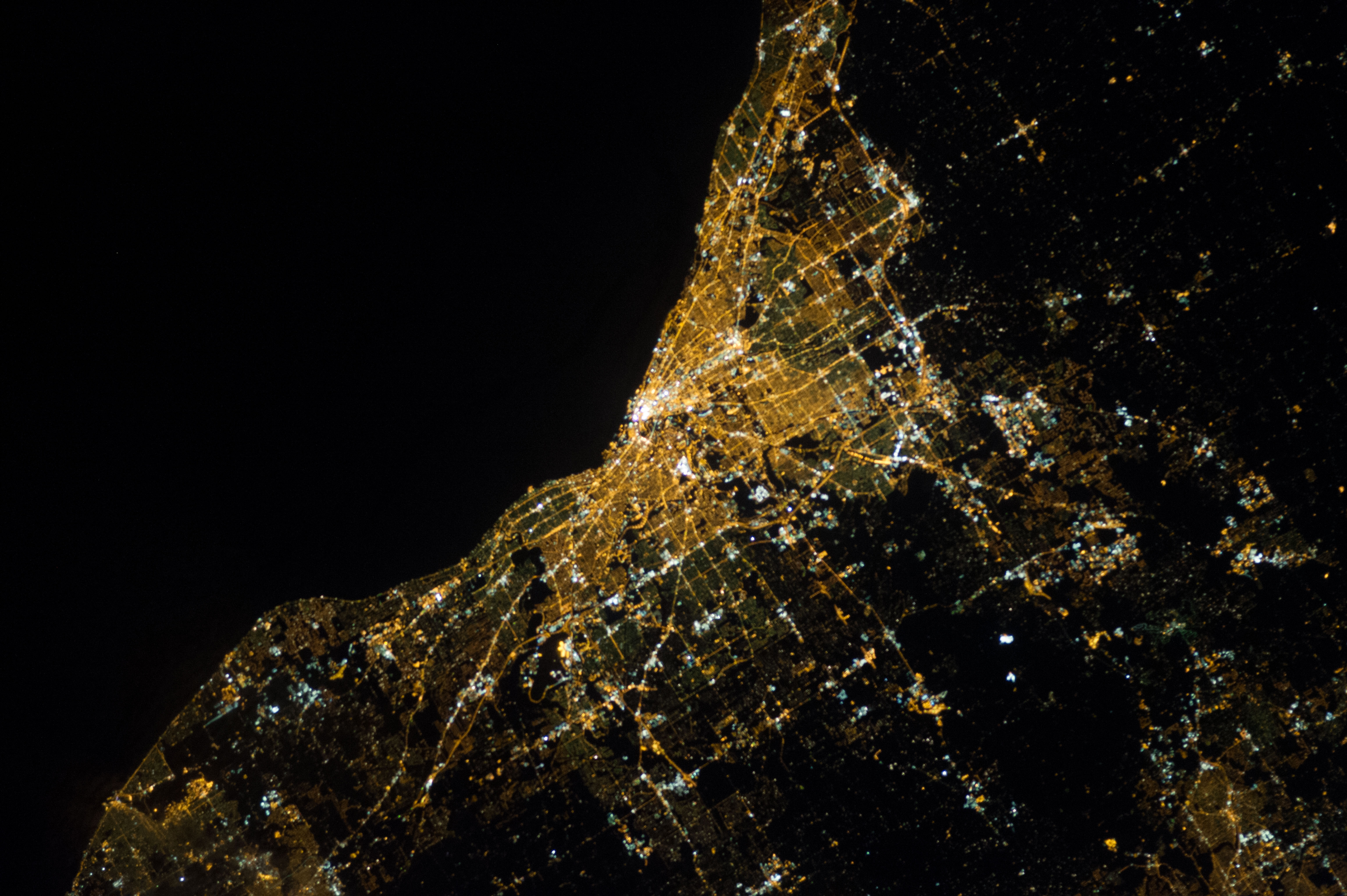
Cleveland

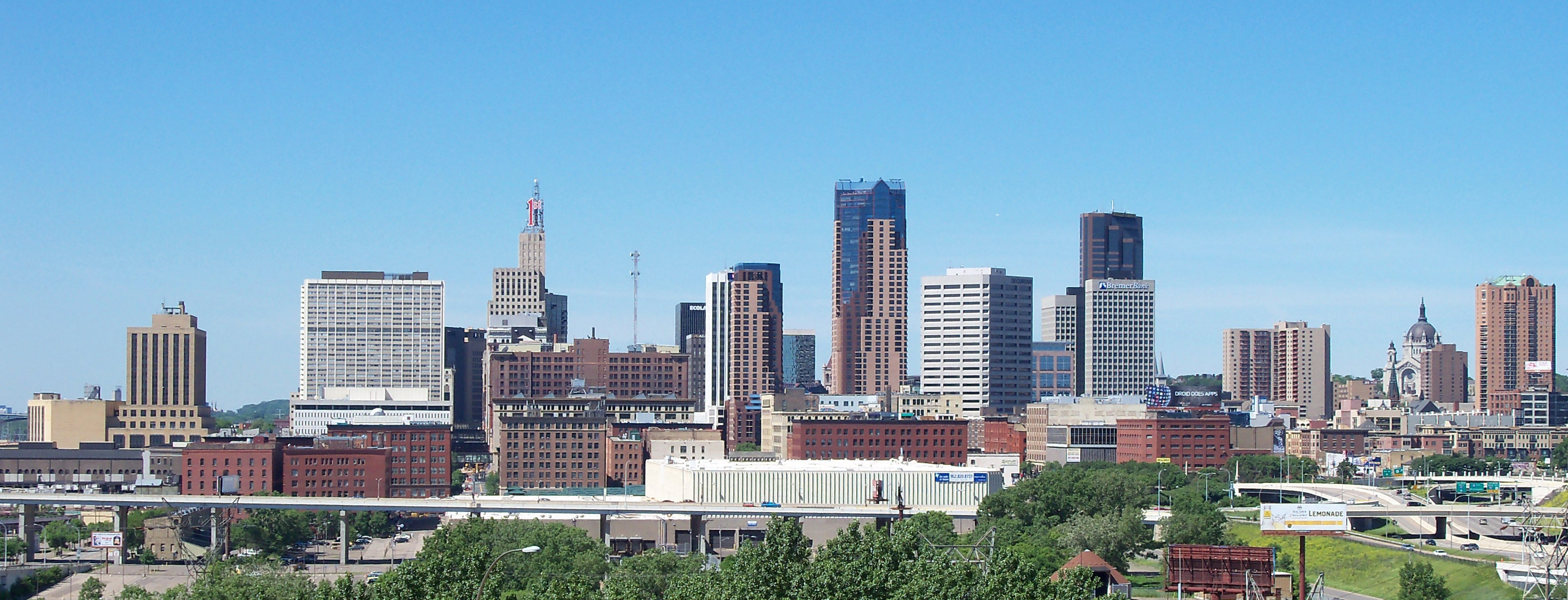
Saint Paul

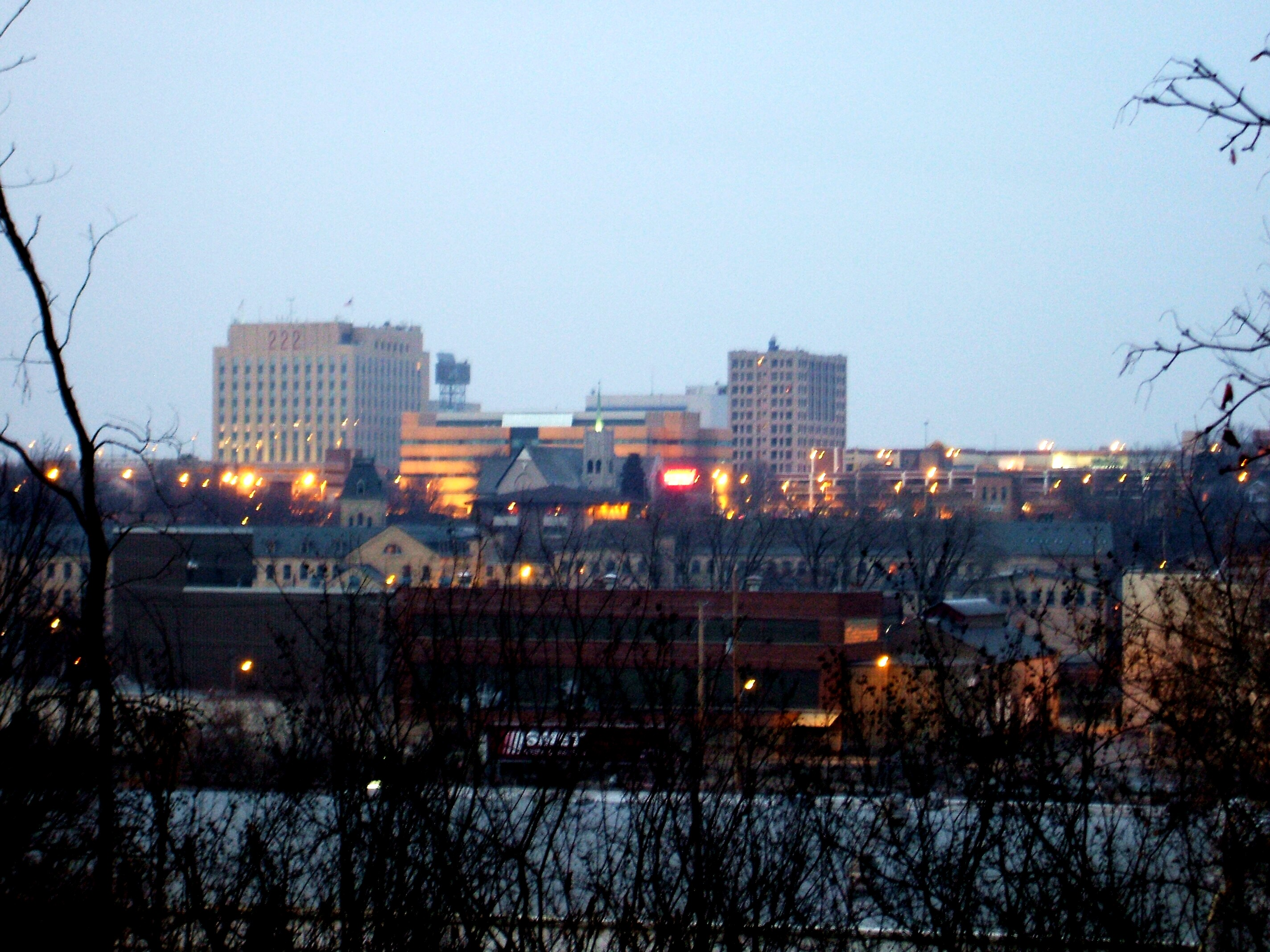
Fox Cities

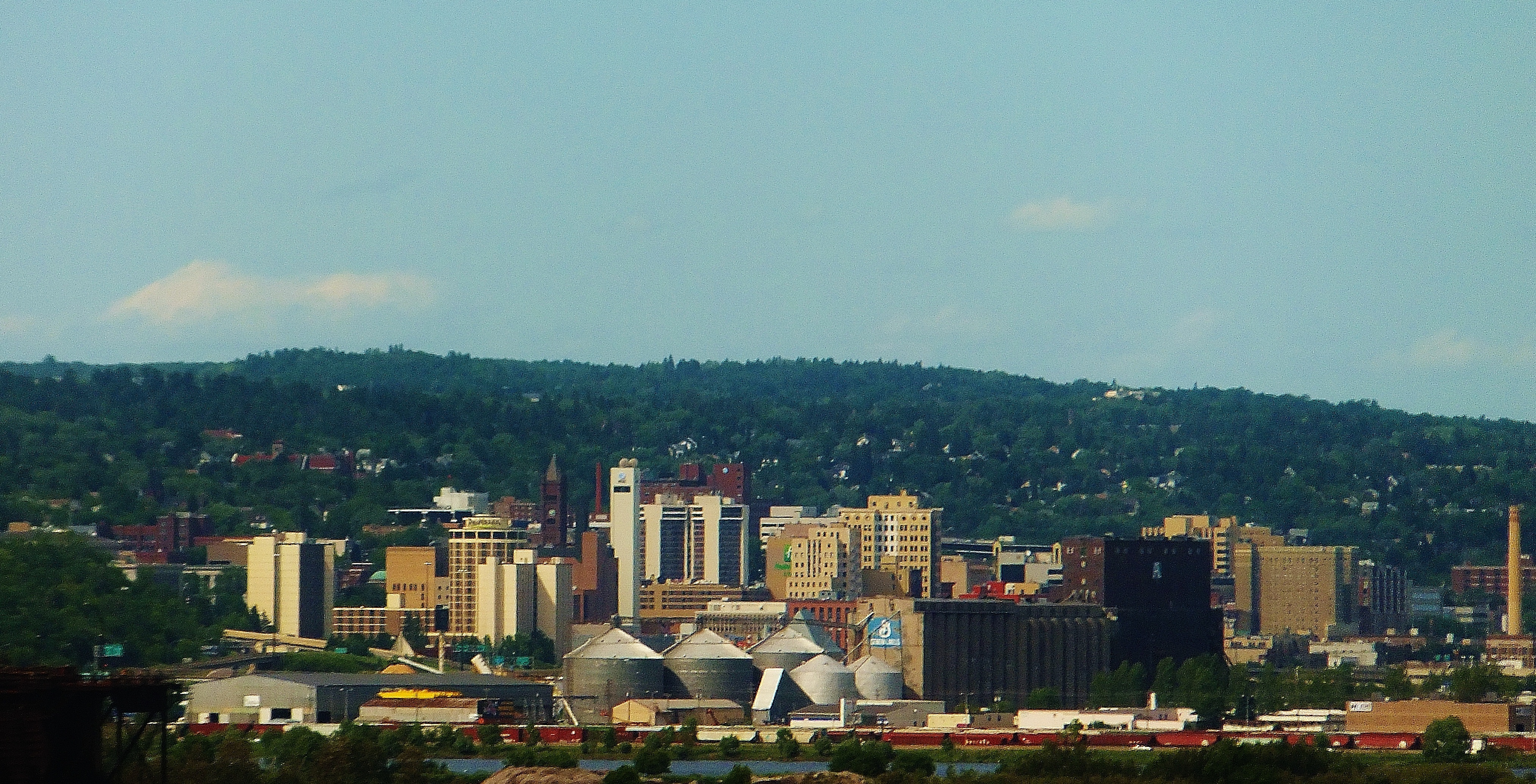
Duluth
