= David Nevin Rankin =

- Born: October 27, 1834; Shippensburg, Pennsylvania, U.S.
- Died: January 1, 1900 (aged 65)
- Education: Thomas Medical College
- Occupations: Physician; surgeon

David Nevin Rankin (October 27, 1834 – January 1, 1900) was an American medical doctor.

== Biography ==
He born in Shippensburg, Pennsylvania on October 27, 1834. After graduation at Jefferson Medical College in 1854, he practiced with his father in his native town until the beginning of the United States Civil War, in which he served as acting assistant surgeon, and aided in opening many of the largest United States army hospitals during the war, among which were the Mansion-house hospital in Alexandria, Virginia, and the Douglas Hospital in Washington, D.C. Afterward he was made one of the thirty surgeons in the volunteer aid corps of surgeons of Pennsylvania, which rendered efficient service. From 1864 to 1966 he was medical examiner of the Pension Bureau, and from 1865 on he was chief physician of the Penitentiary of Western Pennsylvania in Pittsburgh, Pennsylvania. Dr. Rankin was a member of the British medical association in 1884, a delegate to the 8th and 9th International Medical Congresses, and was a member of various medical societies. He contributed numerous articles to medical journals.

He died on January 1, 1900.
