= Boundary Waters Treaty of 1909 =

1909 treaty between the United States and Canada

Boundary Waters Treaty
Treaty Between the United States and Great Britain Relating to Boundary Waters, and Questions Arising Between the United States and Canada
- Signed: January 11, 1909
- Location: Washington, D.C.
- Sealed: May 5, 1910
- Original signatories: James Bryce (UK); Elihu Root (United States)
- Parties: Canada; United States
- Ratifiers: United Kingdom; United States

The Boundary Waters Treaty is the 1909 treaty between the United States, and the United Kingdom with respect to Canada, providing mechanisms for resolving any disputes over waters bordering the U.S. and Canada. The treaty covers the main shore of the lakes and rivers and connecting waterways, or the portions thereof, along which the international boundary between the United States and Canada passes, including all bays, arms, and inlets thereof, but not including tributary waters which in their natural channels would flow into such lakes, rivers, and waterways, or waters flowing from such lakes, rivers, and waterways, or canals or streams, or steams or the waters of rivers flowing across the boundary.

The Parliament of Canada subsequently enacted the International Boundary Waters Treaty Act to implement the treaty.

== History ==
Momentum for a boundary waters treaty built up against a background of difficulties encountered in apportioning the waters of the St. Mary and Milk Rivers in the west, the Rainy River, the Chicago Diversion of Lake Michigan (which at the time lowered lake levels by 6 inches), the St. Mary's River at Sault Ste. Marie, and the Niagara River. Thus at the International Irrigation Congresses in Denver, Colorado, in 1894 and in Albuquerque, New Mexico, in 1895, resolutions were introduced by the Canadian delegate and adopted unanimously by the American, Mexican, and Canadian delegations. The resolution recommended to the United States "the appointment of an international commission to act in conjunction with the authorities of Mexico and Canada in adjudicating the conflicting rights which have arisen, or may hereafter arise, on streams of an international character." In 1896, the Canadian Government requested that the British Ambassador at Washington inform the American Government that it was prepared to cooperate "by appointment of an international commission or otherwise" in the regulation of international streams for irrigation purposes.

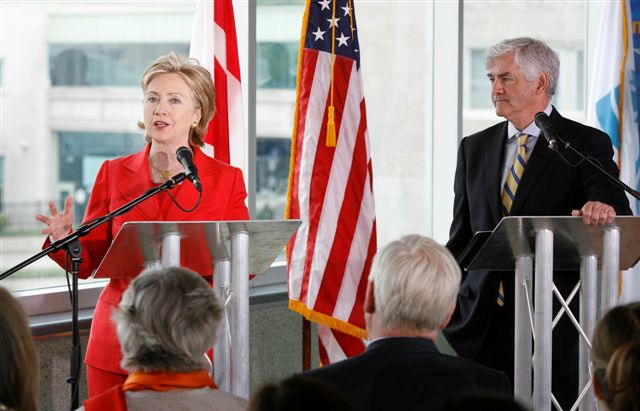
Secretary of State Hillary Clinton and Minister of Foreign Affairs Lawrence Cannon speak on the 100th anniversary of the Treaty in 2009.

In Washington D.C., the treaty was signed for the United States by Secretary of State Elihu Root, and for Canada by the British Ambassador James Bryce on January 11, 1909. It was approved for ratification by the required supermajority (two-thirds) of the American Senate on March 3, 1909. American President William Taft ratified the treaty on May 13, 1910. British King Edward VII ratified Canada's corollary International Boundary Waters Treaty Act.

== Objectives ==
The Treaty's framework prevents and resolves disputes over boundary waters. It defines boundary waters as surface waters along the international border, mostly in whole, excluding upstream tributaries (Preliminary Article). It establishes free use of boundary waters for commerce and navigation forever (Article I). It grants respective federal and state/provincial governments legal jurisdiction over the use, obstruction, and diversion of these waters (Article II). It creates the International Joint Commission (IJC) and requires future hydromodifications be approved by a majority of the three Canadian and three American Commissioners (Articles III, IV, VII, VIII). The IJC can only provide research or orders of approval if either federal government submits a referral (Article IX).

== Effect on water resources ==
The IJC has jurisdiction for regulating water quantity, including flows and levels, the Treaty enumerates the following order of precedence of use (Article VIII):

- Domestic and sanitary use,
- Navigation, and
- Power and irrigation.

The Treaty applies the riparian doctrine that one use cannot materially impair another protected use. Therefore, many issues of water quality are also within the IJC's purview.

== See also ==
- Boundary Waters
- International Joint Commission
- Great Lakes–Saint Lawrence River Basin Sustainable Water Resources Agreement
