= Great Lakes Charter =

Regional governance agreement for Great Lakes states

Principles for the Management of Great Lakes Water Resources
- Signed: February 11, 1985
- Location: Milwaukee, Wisconsin, US
- Condition: Signed by 8 Great Lakes governors and 2 premiers
- Signatories: Illinois; Indiana; Michigan; Minnesota; New York; Ohio; Ontario; Pennsylvania; Quebec; Wisconsin
- Languages: English; French

The Great Lakes Charter is a good-faith agreement among the governors of the U.S. states of Illinois, Indiana, Michigan, Minnesota, New York, Ohio, Pennsylvania and Wisconsin, and the premiers of the Canadian provinces of Ontario and Quebec. The charter outlines a series of principles to collectively manage the use of the Great Lakes Basin's water supply. It also includes a notice and consultation process for proposals to divert large amounts of water out of the Basin and for large in-Basin uses. It was signed on February 11, 1985.

In 2001, the Great Lakes Governors and Premiers signed an Annex to the Great Lakes Charter. This led to the Great Lakes–Saint Lawrence River Basin Sustainable Water Resources Agreement of 2005 and the Great Lakes Compact which became effective in 2008.

The Great Lakes and St. Lawrence Governors and Premiers serves as secretariat to the Governors' and Premiers' Regional Body created by the Agreement and the Governors' Compact Council created by the Compact.
