= MAGIC Fund =

Sales tax growth fund for Minot, North Dakota

The Minot Area Growth through Investment and Cooperation Fund, or MAGIC Fund, is a growth fund financed through a one percent sales tax in the city of Minot, North Dakota. The fund was approved by voters on May 1, 1990, and the money is used for economic development, capital improvements and property tax relief. As of 2012 the MAGIC Fund has invested over $33 million into 200 projects in 44 communities.

== Role in Economic Development ==
Forty percent of the one percent tax is earmarked for economic development and is used to help finance relocations, start-ups and expansions in the Minot area. Minot Area Development Corporation, the lead economic development agency for the city of Minot, targets primary sector businesses such as those in value-added agriculture, knowledge-based business and the energy industry. The availability of MAGIC funds makes Minot more appealing to businesses. The MAGIC Fund is very progressive in that it was one of the first growth funds in the state of North Dakota and the first one to be used regionally.

== Guidelines ==
When the MAGIC Fund was originally established, it was designed to operate with minimal guidelines to allow for the high level of flexibility necessary when assembling financing and incentive packages to benefit potential businesses and the community of Minot. This nonrestrictive nature of the fund has been a source of some criticism though. Local leadership acknowledges that throughout the life of the MAGIC Fund it has been a challenge maintain openness with the public about specific spending while at the same time respecting the confidentiality of business information. Leaders are striving, however, to keep communications clear.

In 2005, new MAGIC Fund guidelines were set in place to clearly define “full time” and to require a breakdown—not an average of—salaries of proposed positions. More recently, in October 2008, the guidelines of the MAGIC Fund underwent public review and area residents were encouraged to offer suggestions. Suggestions included making MAGIC Funds available for private sector projects such as housing, recreation and childcare or using the money for infrastructure purposes such as streets and sewers in order to encourage more housing projects. After consideration, the guidelines review committee decided to continue using MAGIC Funding for business-related projects.

== History ==
The initial creation of the MAGIC Fund in May 1990 established it through 2006 and come June 2004, city voters approved an extension of the 1% city sales tax through the year 2014. The MAGIC Fund has a rich history of aiding economic development in the Minot region, and study after study shows the local economy has benefited drastically from its availability. Historically MAGIC Funds have been used in three main areas of primary sector economic development: knowledge-based employment, agriculture and energy.

Five of the ten largest employers conducting business in Minot today were recruited using MAGIC Funds. Choice Hotels International was one of the first businesses to be recruited using the MAGIC Fund in November 1990, selecting Minot as the location for the company's largest reservation center. Eight years of particularly high productivity later, Choice capitalized on the advantages of the area again and began construction on a $1 million expansion to bring the number of year-round employees in Minot to over 400. Once again, the MAGIC Fund played a big role. In the years between, other service centers such as Sykes in 1996, were attracted to Minot. Drawn also by the MAGIC Fund, Sykes Enterprises came to North Minot's technology park to offer technical support to customers of major companies such as Fortune 500 firms. Sykes notes the level of technology-based education in local schools such as Minot State University have proven extremely important to Sykes’ success in Minot.

In 1998, after searching 29 cities nationwide, Minneapolis-based ReliaStar (now ING Service Center) made the decision to expand its financial services company to Minot, ND with a new 90,000-square-foot (8,400 m^{2}) service center employing 400 full-time workers. In February 2000, the company expanded its Minot work force from 450 to 600 workers thanks to the financial assistance provided by the City of Minot's MAGIC Fund. MLT Inc., a Northwest Airlines Corporation company, was offered one of the most aggressive incentives packages at the time and it soon followed suit by coming to Minot in 1999 and a year later expanded their workforce to approximately 600 as well. Local businesses such as Midwest Telemark International (MTI) have also flourished with the help of the non-provincial MAGIC Fund. Started by two entrepreneurs in Mohall, ND, MTI now has employs over 450 people in seven centers in rural communities including Bottineau, Kenmare, Stanley, Beulah, Langdon, and Grafton.2002 annual report

Companies often cite an available, quality workforce and infrastructure for why they chose Minot to conduct business and expand. In the communications world, this necessary infrastructure is seen in the form of a sophisticated telecommunications network, offering fiber optic and high-speed internet access. Locally owned SRT Communications offers just that, as well as phone service to the Minot area. State-of-the-art systems are in place to support these expanding businesses, but without the MAGIC Fund which helped fuel the growth of the communications business throughout the area, they may not have seen the need to upgrade so rapidly.2002 annual report Continual capital investments in infrastructure keep the city prime for expansion.

Other areas of development include value-added agriculture. In 1994 Bourgault Industries was recruited to Minot with the availability of MAGIC Funds, although the Saskatchewan-based agriculture equipment manufacturer did not in the end need to use the funding. By 1995 construction was complete and the facility was up and running as the main office for Bourgault's U.S. assembly, marketing and distribution center. Bourgault Industries recently announced (2008) expansion to bring several production lines to Minot, creating 20-30 new jobs in the area. Similarly, in 1996, Minot Milling (a division of Philadelphia Macaroni Company) came to Minot with the help of the MAGIC Fund although it turned out the company did not need monetary assistance.

As per the nature of economic development, risk will sometimes be realized and ventures will fail. MedVision, for example, came to Minot in 1997 and left a year later after only creating several jobs. It took several years for the MAGIC Fund to recover the $2 million loan in full. WebSmart Interactive, initially a provider of telemarketing sales verification was founded at the height of the internet boom. After a short period of rapid growth WebSmart began outgoing sales calls, the primary client of which was a Georgia-based company. This company eventually failed to forward payment to WebSmart, forcing an abrupt closure of the company. At the outset of 2001, after the failures of aforementioned businesses, there was essentially no money to work with in the MAGIC Fund. A measure was proposed to divert money from a one percent sales tax for Northwest Area Water Supply and extend the fund but it was defeated.

Multiple studies were conducted in attempt to measure the successes of the MAGIC Fund and find areas for improvement, including reverse analyses to show what Minot's economy would be like if not for the MAGIC Fund. One such study, conducted in 2001 by the Economic Strategy Center Inc. of Atlanta, Georgia found that for every 10 jobs created through MAGIC Funding, approximately 8.5 additional jobs are created in the area. Further, for every dollar earned through MAGIC Fund activity, an additional 70 cents was added to the local economy.

The balance of the fund grew, but officials wanted to implement changes to further decrease the risk involved in assisting ventures. After the 2002 mayoral election, a 3-man committee was appointed by Mayor Curt Zimbelman to study issues such as repeat failure to meet job creation targets with no clear penalties for such actions and the conditions that MAGIC Fund grants were disbursed under being ignored and to create a new set of guidelines. The new guidelines were officially approved by the city council.

== Recent events ==
MAGIC funds are currently being utilized in three major area projects. The MAGIC Fund has supported all of these projects through payments directly related to building permanent infrastructure such as water and roads. In the future, the Fund plans to continue supporting infrastructure grants and loans. The first of its kind in the state, intermodal transportation facility The Port of North Dakota is in the works in northeast Minot. The Port anticipates to benefit businesses in an approximate 150-mile (240 km) radius of Minot stretching into Montana, South Dakota and Saskatchewan by offering identity preserved bulk transportation at the intersection of two Class One railroads, two major state highways and airport runway facilities, all near the geographical center of North America. Construction began in 2006 (citation), and in March, the project took a huge step forward when BNSF Railway announced its cooperation with a proposed statewide rail strategy to reduce rates for containers of bulk commodities shipped from the Minot and Fargo-Dilworth areas.

Another major project the MAGIC Fund is aiding in is in the Value-added Ag Complex, an agri-business park also located in northeast Minot. Minot Milling, anchor tenant of the complex, recently celebrated its tenth anniversary of operations in Minot and was named the recipient of the Corporate Citizenship Award for its years of service to the community and for being such a valuable asset to the Ag Complex. In late September 2008, California-based C&F Foods closed on the purchase of MG Grain, an unfinished lentil processing facility in the Ag Park.

The third major project aided by the MAGIC Fund is the Great Plains Energy Park. The project was first conceptualized in March 2008 and in April $1.1 million in MAGIC Funding was approved for the infrastructure of the park. The first Phase of the Park has been entirely sold out, allowing Minot Area Development Corporation to pay back $857,000 to the MAGIC Fund In October, after the repayment of initial funding, $1.69 million in additional MAGIC funding was approved for the build out of Phase II of the Park.

== MAGIC Fund Screening Committee ==
Seven area residents sit on the MAGIC Fund Screening Committee, appointed by the mayor and confirmed by the City Council. Members represent the financial, professional, labor, business and trade communities. Initially, the MAGIC Fund Screening Committee's singular role was to review applications submitted by organizations for MAGIC funding and pass them along to the Minot City Council if approved. In the next step of the process, the City Council votes on the request at its next monthly meeting.

In 2003 the Committee adopted guidelines to require its chairman to submit a written report including fiscal information, performance evaluations, an assessment of the management health of the MAGIC Fund and a listing of all applications not approved by the committee. Two years later members of the committee recommended that all members be required to obtain some level of education in economic development. Suggestions for this included Souris Basin Planning Council seminars or statewide economic development conferences.
