= International Joint Commission =

Organisation managing Canada–US border waters

- International Joint Commission; Commission mixte internationale
- Abbreviation: IJC; CMI
- Formation: 11 January 1909; 117 years ago
- Legal status: Active
- Headquarters: Ottawa, Ontario, Canada; Washington, D.C., U.S.
- Official languages: English and French
- Chairperson (Canadian section): Pierre Baril
- Chairperson (US section): Gerald Acker
- Website: ijc.org

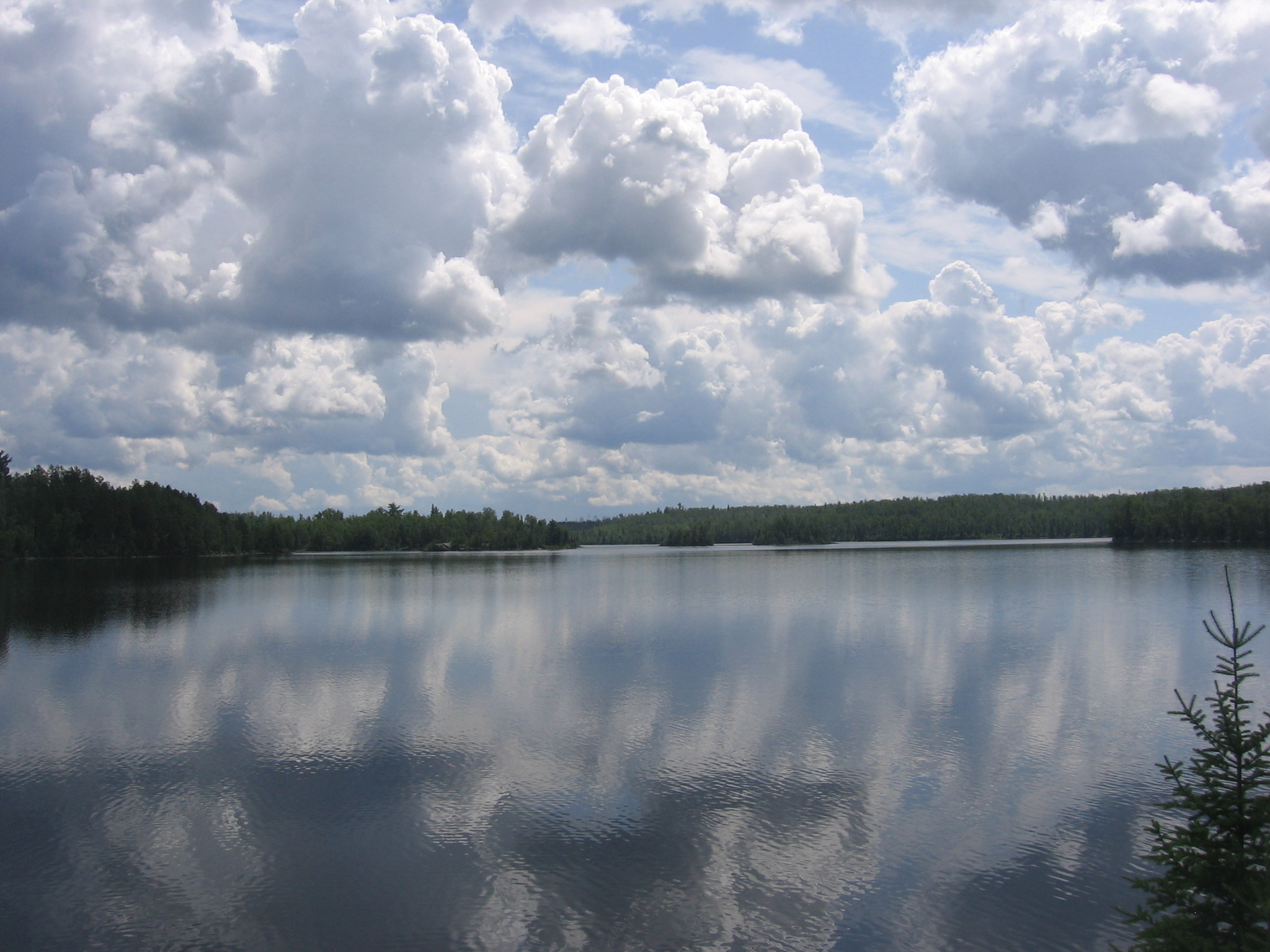
Sections of Canada and the United States (including in the Boundary Waters Canoe Area Wilderness, above) are separated by a boundary that is in water. A particularly extensive section of the Canada–U.S. border is in the Great Lakes.

The International Joint Commission (French: Commission mixte internationale) is a bi-national organization established by the governments of the United States and Canada under the Boundary Waters Treaty of 1909. Its responsibilities were expanded with the signing of the Great Lakes Water Quality Agreement of 1972 (later amended in 1987 and 2012). The commission deals with issues affecting the extensive waters and waterways along the Canada–United States border.

A six-member commission, it has multiple sub-commissions, which deal with particular sections of the border-waters, or topics, and a technical staff to organize and inform task-forces.

In a report published in January 2025, called on the U.S. and Canadian governments to take action to monitor microplastics in the lakes, and to designate microplastics a "chemical of mutual concern". Scientists in the group's advisory board would like to see new policies to help reduce plastic production and consumption. They also recommend individual actions, such as single-use plastic products, and installing filters on washing machines and dryers so that plastic fibers are not released with wastewater.

== Role of the IJC ==
Canada and the United States created the International Joint Commission because they recognized that each country is affected by the other's actions in the lake and river systems along the border. The two countries cooperate to manage these waters and to protect them for the benefit of today's citizens and future generations.

The IJC is guided by the Boundary Waters Treaty, signed by Britain on behalf of Canada and the United States in 1909. The treaty provides general principles, rather than detailed prescriptions, for preventing and resolving disputes over waters shared between the two countries and for settling other transboundary issues. The specific application of these principles is decided on a case-by-case basis.

The IJC has two main responsibilities: approving projects that affect water levels and flows across the boundary and investigating transboundary issues and recommending solutions. The IJC's recommendations and decisions take into account the needs of a wide range of water uses, including drinking water, commercial shipping, hydroelectric power generation, agriculture, ecosystem health, industry, fishing, recreational boating, and shoreline property.

== Mission and mandates ==
The International Joint Commission prevents and resolves disputes between the United States and Canada under the 1909 Boundary Waters Treaty and pursues the common good of both countries as an independent and objective advisor to the two governments.

In particular, the IJC rules upon applications for approval of projects affecting boundary or transboundary waters and may regulate the operation of these projects; it assists the two countries in the protection of the transboundary environment, including the implementation of the Great Lakes Water Quality Agreement and the improvement of transboundary air quality; and it alerts the governments to emerging issues along the boundary that may give rise to bilateral disputes.

== Authorities ==
=== Orders of approval ===
The IJC has the authority to issue orders of approval. These orders place conditions on the application and operation of projects, such as dams, diversions, or bridges that would affect the natural level of boundary waters. The application process for an order of approval is outlined in the IJC guide to applications.

=== References ===
The IJC studies and recommends solutions to transboundary issues when asked to do so by the national governments. When the IJC receives a government request, called a reference, it appoints a board with an equal number of experts from each country. Board members are chosen for their professional abilities, not as representatives of a particular organization or region.

== Activities ==
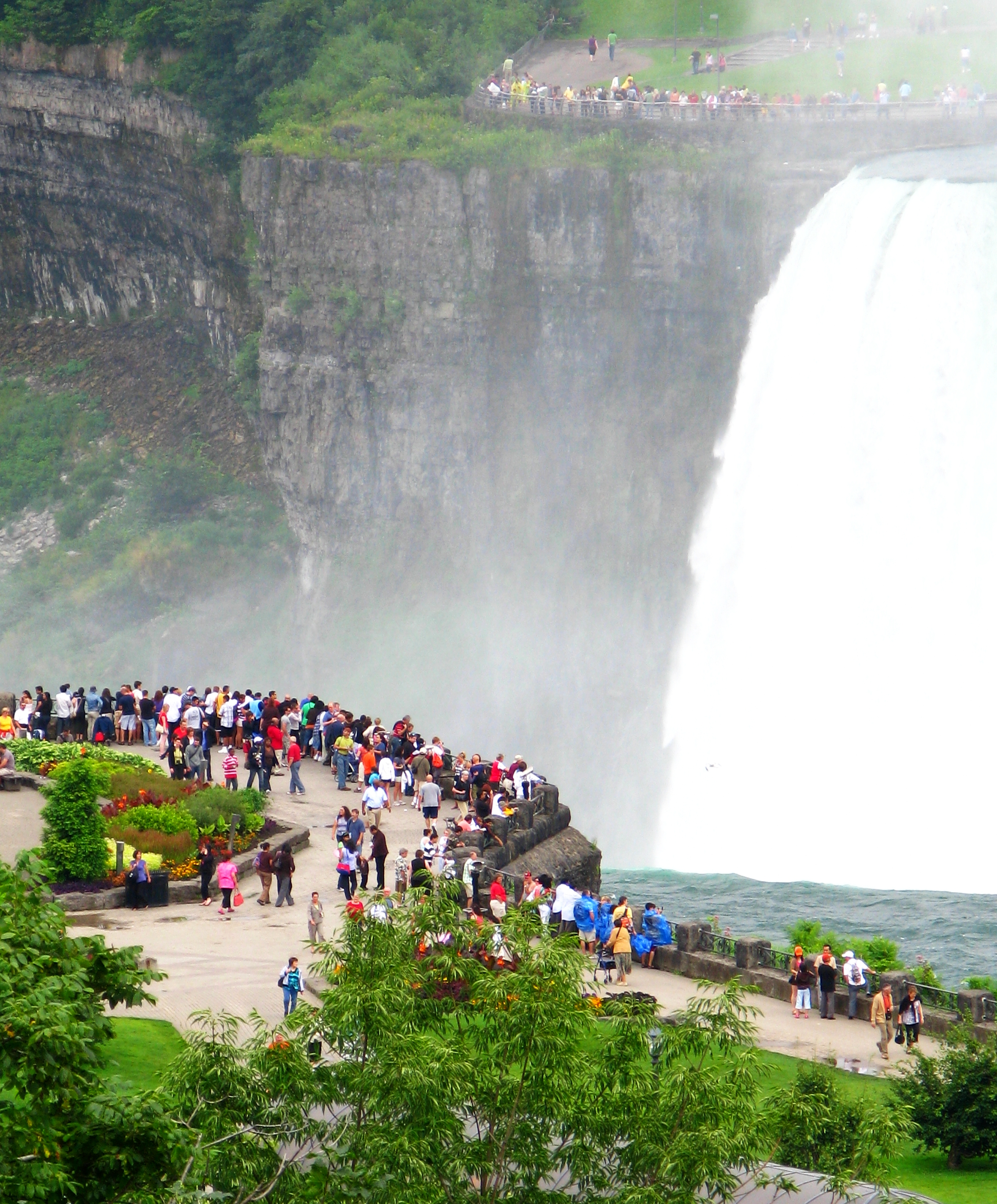
The movement of the water near Niagara Falls on the border is used to generate substantial hydroelectricity.

=== Regulating shared water uses ===
The IJC makes decisions on applications for projects, such as dams and diversions, that affect the natural level and flow of water across the boundary. Changing water levels can affect drinking water intakes, commercial shipping, hydroelectric power generation, agriculture, shoreline property, recreation, fisheries, wildlife, wetlands, and other interests.

If the IJC approves a project, it may impose conditions on project design or operation to protect interests on either side of the boundary. The IJC may also appoint a board to monitor compliance with operational requirements, such as flows through a dam. Projects approved by the IJC include hydroelectric power projects in the Great Lakes and on the St. Lawrence River, the St. Croix River and the Columbia River. The IJC is also responsible for maintaining emergency water levels in the Lake of the Woods basin and for apportioning water among various uses in the Souris River, St. Mary River, and Milk River basins.

=== Improving air quality ===
As well as damaging rivers and lakes, air pollution affects human health, especially for people with respiratory illnesses such as chronic bronchitis and asthma. Over the years, the American and Canadian governments have asked the IJC to bring to their attention, or to investigate, air pollution problems in boundary regions. To support these activities, the IJC created the International Air Quality Advisory Board. As well, under the 1991 Canada–United States Air Quality Agreement, the IJC is required to collect and synthesize public comments on the air quality progress report published by the governments every two years.

=== Improving water quality ===
In the Boundary Waters Treaty, Canada and the United States agreed that neither country would pollute boundary waters, or waters that flow across the boundary, to an extent that would cause injury to health or property in the other country. When asked by governments, the IJC investigates, monitors, and recommends actions regarding the quality of water in lakes and rivers along the Canada–United States border. The IJC has water quality responsibilities for the St. Croix River, the Rainy River, and the Red River. Much of the Commission's work focuses on helping governments clean up the Great Lakes and prevent further pollution.

=== Investigating issues and recommending solutions ===
The IJC studies and recommends solutions to transboundary issues when asked to do so by the national governments. When the IJC receives a government request, called a reference, it appoints a board with an equal number of experts from each country. Board members are chosen for their professional abilities, not as representatives of a particular organization or region.

References to the IJC have focused mostly on water and air quality and on the development and use of shared water resources. For example, one reference led to the Great Lakes Water Quality Agreement (1972), in which the two countries agreed to control pollution and to clean up wastewater from industries and communities. In 1978, a new agreement added a commitment to rid the Great Lakes of persistent toxic substances, which remain in the environment for a long time and can poison food sources for animals and people. Although IJC reference recommendations are not binding, they are usually accepted by the Canadian and American governments.

== Organization ==
The Commission is headed by six commissioners, three from each country. The Commissioners are appointed by the governments of Canada and the United States. Commissioners do not represent their governments. The Canadian Commissioners appointed in 2019 are Pierre Béland (Canadian Chair), Merrel-Ann Phare, and F. Henry Lickers. The American Commissioners appointed in 2019 are Jane Corwin (American Chair), Robert C. Sisson, and Lance V. Yohe. The Commission has three offices, in Ottawa, Washington, D.C., and Windsor, Ontario. The Windsor Great Lakes Regional Office (GLRO) was created under the Great Lakes Water Quality Agreement (GLWQA). It is staffed by a bi-national team of American and Canadian scientists and support staff.

=== Current commissioners ===
The current commissioners as of 24 May 2026:

Position	Name	Section	Term start	Term end	Home State/Province	Appointed by
Canadian co-chair	Pierre Baril	Canada	24 June 2024	23 June 2028	Quebec	Mary Simon on advice of Justin Trudeau
Commissioner	Merrell-Ann Phare	Canada	9 May 2019	20 December 2027	Manitoba	Julie Payette, Mary Simon on advice of Justin Trudeau
Commissioner	Susan Chiblow	Canada	21 December 2023	20 December 2027	Ontario	Mary Simon on advice of Justin Trudeau
U.S. co-chair	Gerald Acker	United States	27 July 2023	None	Michigan	Joe Biden
Commissioner	Lance Yohe	United States	16 May 2019	None	North Dakota	Donald Trump
Commissioner	Robert Gioia	United States	2 May 2024	None	(New York (state)) New York	Joe Biden

== Boards ==
Separate boards are responsible for particular boundary waters issues. When there are special issues, a Task Force is assigned to make a report or recommendations. The various standing bodies are:

- Accredited Officers of the St. Mary and Milk Rivers
- Great Lakes Science Advisory Board
- Great Lakes Water Quality Board
- Great Lakes-St. Lawrence River Adaptive Management Committee
- Health Professionals Advisory Board
- International Columbia River Board of Control
- International Kootenay Lake Board of Control
- International Lake Champlain-Richelieu River Study Board
- International Lake of the Woods Control Board
- International Lake Ontario-St. Lawrence River Board
- International Lake Superior Board of Control
- International Niagara Board of Control
- International Osoyoos Lake Board of Control
- International Rainy-Lake of the Woods Watershed Board
- International Red River Board
- International Souris River Board
- International Souris River Study Board
- International St. Croix River Watershed Board
- Nutrient Loading and Impacts in Lakes Champlain and Memphremagog

== Locations ==
- IJC Canadian Section – 234 Laurier Avenue West, 22nd Floor Ottawa, Ontario
- IJC United States Section – 1717 H Street NW, Suite 835, Washington, D.C.
- Great Lakes Regional Office – 100 Ouellette Ave., 8th Floor, Windsor, Ontario

== See also ==
- Commission for Environmental Cooperation
- Great Lakes Fishery Commission
- International Boundary and Water Commission (U.S. and Mexico)
- International Boundary Commission
- Title 22 of the Code of Federal Regulations
