= Great Lakes and St. Lawrence Governors and Premiers =

North american intergovernmental organization

Conference of Great Lakes St. Lawrence Governors and Premiers
- Logo of the organization
- Abbreviation: GSGP
- Formation: 1983
- Type: Non-governmental organization
- Headquarters: Chicago, Illinois
- Region served: Great Lakes Region and Saint Lawrence River Valley
- Chair: Gov. Gretchen Whitmer
- Website: www.gsgp.org

The Conference of Great Lakes and St. Lawrence Governors and Premiers (GSGP) is a North American intergovernmental organization led by the governing chief executives of the Canadian provinces of Ontario and Québec and the US states of Illinois, Indiana, Michigan, Minnesota, New York, Ohio, Pennsylvania, and Wisconsin. Through the organization, they seek to grow the region's economy and protect the Great Lakes. The organization began in 1983 as the Council of Great Lakes Governors to encourage and facilitate environmentally responsible economic development. The council now serves as secretariat to the governors’ Compact Council and the governor and premiers’ Regional Body.

== History ==
The Conference of Great Lakes and St. Lawrence Governors and Premiers is an organization of the chief executives from Illinois, Indiana, Michigan, Minnesota, New York, Ohio, Ontario, Pennsylvania, Québec, and Wisconsin. Through the organization, the governors and premiers seek to expand the regional $6 trillion economy and protect the world's largest system of surface fresh water. The Conference builds upon over 30 years of work by the United States' Council of Great Lakes Governors to encourage and facilitate environmentally responsible economic development.

The governors of Illinois, Indiana, Michigan, Minnesota, Ohio and Wisconsin created the Council of Great Lakes Governors in 1983. The original goal was to create a non-partisan forum to promote regional agreements on issues of concern for the states of the Great Lakes region. In 1989, the governors of New York and Pennsylvania joined the council. In more recent years, the premiers of Ontario and Quebec joined with the governors as associate members, and in 2015, the organization launched the "Conference of Great Lakes and St. Lawrence Governors and Premiers," to signify the increasing bi-national cooperation, with full membership for all parties. Since its inception, the Conference has led regional efforts to protect the environment and accelerate the region's economy.

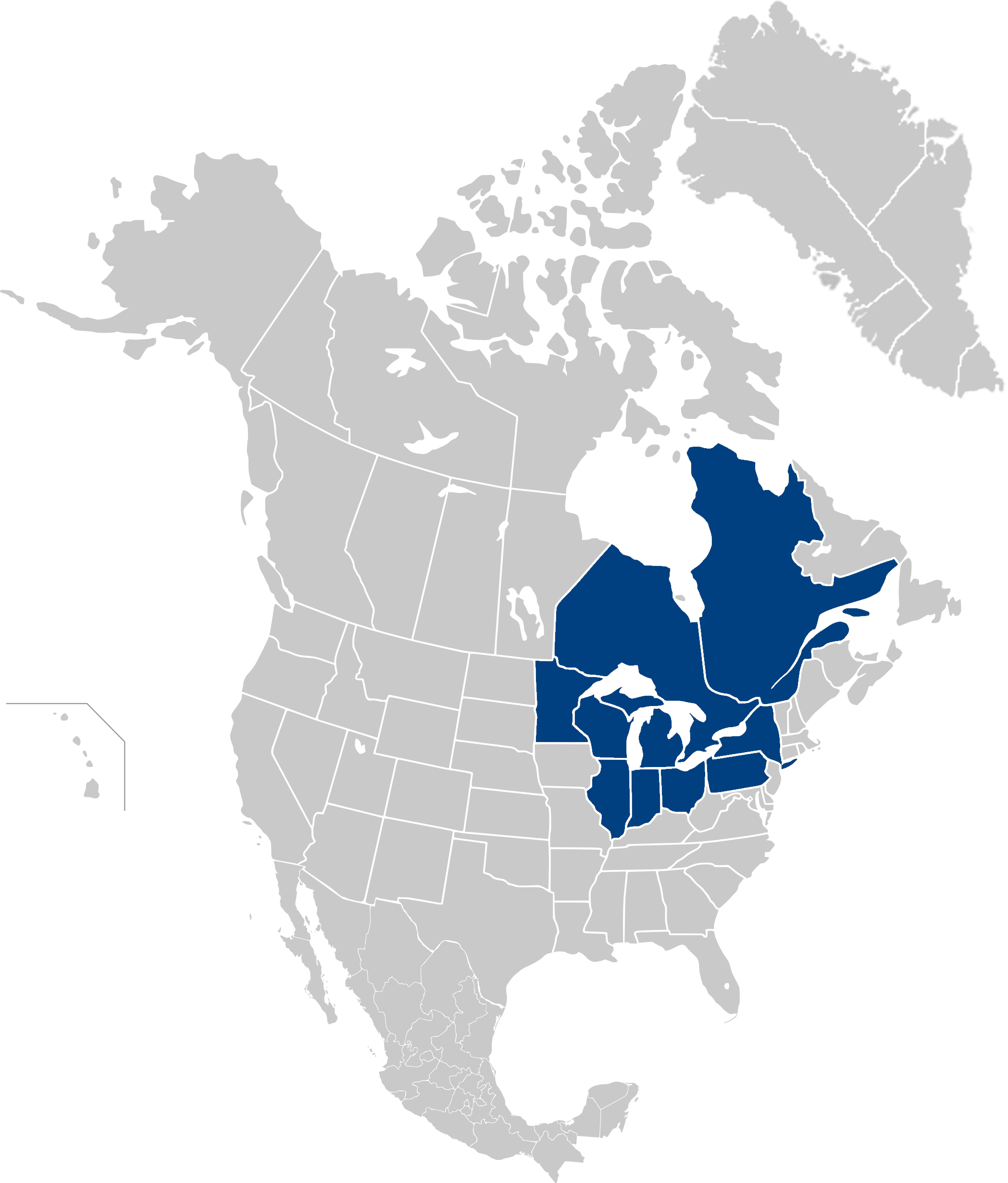
The member states and provinces, marked in blue, surround the Great Lakes

The initial focus of the organization was biomass energy. The organization administered the regional biomass energy program in coordination with the United States Department of Energy from 1983 until 2009. They received over $13 million in federal funding which was then provided as grants to the states geared toward biomass energy promotion.

In the following years, the governors and premiers drafted and enacted several agreements developed through the organization. In 1985, the governors and premiers signed the Great Lakes Charter, a regional water management agreement. In 1986, the governors signed the Toxic Substances Control Agreement, ultimately resulting in the establishment of the Great Lakes Protection Fund in 1989, the first multi-state publicly seeded private endowment and trust fund dedicated to benefit a specific ecosystem. The TSCA also helped launch the U.S. Environmental Protection Agency's Great Lakes Water Quality Initiative in the 1990s.

In 1988, the governors signed the Economic Development Agreement, and with the premiers in 1989, created Great Lakes of North America (now Great Lakes USA), a tourist promotional arm of the organization. In 1990, they opened their first international trade office in Canada. The organization has since opened trade offices in Brazil, Chile, Mexico, South Africa, Australia, India, the United Kingdom, Germany, Japan, Israel, South Korea, Caribbean/Central America, UAE, Singapore and China.

In 2003, the organization identified nine priorities to restore and protect the Great Lakes. These priorities served as the basis for the Great Lakes Regional Collaboration, which was launched following an Executive Order by then President of the United States George W. Bush. In 2009, President Barack Obama launched the Great Lakes Restoration Initiative which has already provided over $2 billion in federal funding to help achieve the priorities.

In 2005, the organization completed the creation of a binding, regional framework to manage and protect the water supply of the Great Lakes–St. Lawrence River Basin. The governors and premiers signed the Great Lakes–Saint Lawrence River Basin Sustainable Water Resources Agreement and the governors endorsed the companion Great Lakes Compact. This compact was enacted into United States law in 2008 following approval by the state legislatures and the United States Congress.

== Economic development ==
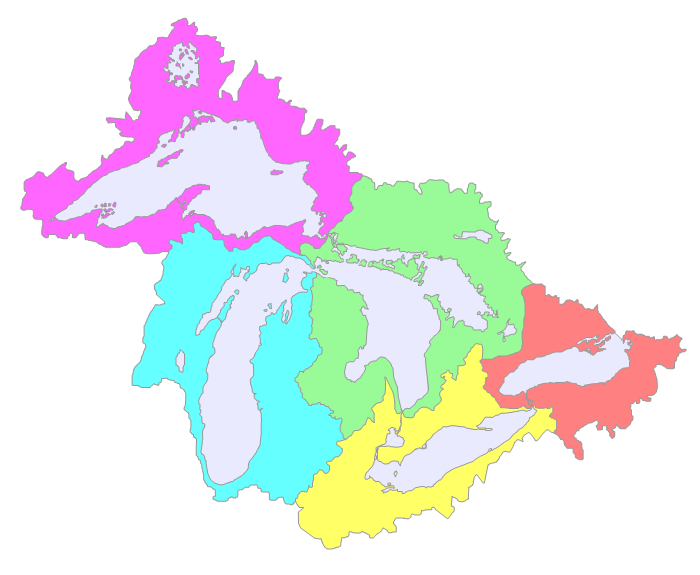
A map of the Great Lakes Basin showing the five sub-basins within. Left to right they are: Superior (magenta); Michigan (cyan); Huron (pale green); Erie (yellow); Ontario (light coral).

The organization's goals are to enhance competitiveness, grow the regional economy and create jobs. Ongoing initiatives include:

- Export promotion: Managing sixteen export offices around the world to connect regional companies with consumers in the world's most dynamic markets
- Maritime transportation: Striving to double maritime trade while shrinking the overall environmental impact of the region's transportation network
- Tourism: Marketing the region's destinations to tourists from key international markets in the UK, Ireland and the German speaking Countries, and promoting cruising in the Great Lakes.
- Great Lakes St. Lawrence Trees Initiative: A regional effort with the goal of planting 250 million trees by 2033
- 100% Great Lakes Fish: Demonstrate how 100% of commercially-caught fish from the Great Lakes can be used for different purposes and beyond just food.

== Environmental protection ==
The organization's goal is to restore and protect the region's waters. Ongoing initiatives include:

- Restoration and protection: Spearheading a long-term, regional strategy to improve water quality with a focus on key priorities such as reducing nutrient enrichment and harmful algal blooms.
- Aquatic invasive species: Leading regional efforts to help combat Asian carp and other non-native aquatic species that threaten native species in the Great Lakes' waters.
- Water quantity: Managing an innovative, legally binding framework to protect the region's water supply.

== Leadership ==
Chair	Years served
Gov. Gretchen Whitmer	2024–Present
Gov. Tony Evers	2019–2023
Gov. Rick Snyder*	2013–2019
Gov. Pat Quinn*	2013–2015
Gov. Mitch Daniels*	2011–2013
Gov. Ted Strickland*	2010–2011
Gov. Jim Doyle*	2004–2011
Gov. Bob Taft*	2001–2005
Gov. Tom Ridge	1996–2001
Gov. John Engler	1994–1996
Gov. George Voinovich	1992–1994
Gov. Tommy Thompson	1989–1992
Gov. Richard Celeste	1987–1989
Gov. James R. Thompson	1985–1987
Gov. Anthony Earl	1983–1985
Gov. Rudy Perpich	1983

- Snyder and Quinn served as co-Chairs from January 2013 to 2015
- Daniels and Quinn served as co-Chairs from January 2011 to 2013
- Doyle and Strickland served as co-Chairs from 2010 to January 2011
- Taft and Doyle were co-Chairs in 2004–2005
