= Great Lakes–Saint Lawrence River Basin Sustainable Water Resources Agreement =

North American environmental agreement

- Signed: December 13, 2005
- Location: Milwaukee, Wisconsin, U.S.
- Condition: Signature by eight Great Lakes governors and two Canadian premiers
- Signatories: Illinois; Indiana; Michigan; Minnesota; New York; Ohio; Ontario; Pennsylvania; Quebec; Wisconsin
- Languages: French, English
- glslregionalbody.org

The Great Lakes–Saint Lawrence River Basin Sustainable Water Resources Agreement is a good-faith agreement among the Governors of the U.S. states of Illinois, Indiana, Michigan, Minnesota, New York, Ohio, Pennsylvania, and Wisconsin, and the Premiers of the Canadian provinces of Ontario and Quebec. The agreement details how the States and Provinces will manage the use of the Great Lakes Basin's water supply and builds on the 1985 Great Lakes Charter and its 2001 Annex. It was signed on December 13, 2005.

== Implementation ==
The agreement provides a framework for each Great Lakes state and province to enact programs and laws protecting the Basin. The states are meeting the agreement's commitments through the companion Great Lakes Compact. This compact was enacted into law on December 8, 2008, following approval by the state legislatures and the United States Congress, and signature by President George W. Bush.

In order to put the agreement into law in Ontario and Quebec, the provinces amended their statutes and regulations. It was enacted by the Quebec National Assembly on June 11, 2009, and by the Ontario Provincial Parliament on June 4, 2007. Ontario's Implementing Regulations were adopted on January 1, 2015, allowing the Agreement to begin coming fully into force as of March 8, 2015.

The Conference of Great Lakes and St. Lawrence Governors and Premiers serves as secretariat to the Governors' and Premiers' Regional Body created by the Agreement and the Governors' Compact Council created by the Compact.
