= Great Lakes Compact =

2008 agreement between US states

- Long title: Great Lakes–St. Lawrence River Basin Water Resources Compact
- Enacted by: the 110th United States Congress
- Effective: December 8, 2008

Citations
- Public law: 110-342

Legislative history
- Introduced in the Senate as S.J.Res 45 by Carl Levin on July 23, 2008; Passed the Senate on August 1, 2008 (unanimous consent); Passed the House of Representatives on September 23, 2008 (390 yea, 25 nay, 18 not voting); Signed into law by President George W. Bush on October 3, 2008

Member states of the Great Lakes Compact

The Great Lakes–St. Lawrence River Basin Water Resources Compact is a legally binding interstate compact among the U.S. states of Illinois, Indiana, Michigan, Minnesota, New York, Ohio, Pennsylvania and Wisconsin. The compact details how the states manage the use of the Great Lakes Basin's water supply and builds on the 1985 Great Lakes Charter and its 2001 Annex. The compact is the means by which the states implement the governors' commitments under the Great Lakes–St. Lawrence River Basin Sustainable Water Resources Agreement that also includes the Premiers of Ontario and Quebec.

The Conference of Great Lakes and St. Lawrence Governors and Premiers (formerly the Council of Great Lakes Governors)—which guided the negotiations that resulted in the compact—now serves as secretariat to the Governors' Compact Council created by the compact.

== Ratification ==
Following approval by each of the eight member-state legislatures, the compact was signed by Minnesota Gov. Tim Pawlenty on February 20, 2007; Illinois Gov. Rod Blagojevich on August 17, 2007; Indiana Gov. Mitch Daniels on February 20, 2008; New York Gov. Eliot Spitzer on March 4, 2008; Wisconsin Gov. Jim Doyle on May 27, 2008; Ohio Gov. Ted Strickland on June 27, 2008; Pennsylvania Gov. Ed Rendell on July 4, 2008; and Michigan Gov. Jennifer Granholm on July 9, 2008. The U.S. Senate passed the compact on August 1, 2008, and the U.S. House of Representatives followed on September 23, 2008. President George W. Bush signed it on October 3, 2008. The compact became state and federal law on December 8, 2008.

== Wisconsin v. Illinois United States Supreme Court case ==
Due to the United States Supreme Court ruling in Wisconsin v. Illinois, the State of Illinois is not subject to certain provisions of the compact pertaining to new or increased withdrawals or diversions from the Great Lakes.

== Waukesha Proposal ==
In 2013, the city of Waukesha, Wisconsin, applied for permission from the State of Wisconsin to withdraw water from Lake Michigan. City water historically drawn from an aquifer reached radium levels exceeding federal standards. After protests and later negotiations with state officials, Waukesha became obligated to find a new water source by 2018. The city's limits lay 1.5 miles outside the Lake Michigan drainage boundary; however, the county in which it resides straddles the watersheds of both the Mississippi (via the Fox River, which runs through Waukesha) and the Great Lakes.

In 2015, the Wisconsin Department of Natural Resources (DNR) preliminarily determined that the proposal was approvable in its Draft Technical Review and also released a Draft Environmental Impact Statement. The public comment period on the Draft Technical Review and Draft Environmental Impact Statement ended on August 28, 2015.

On January 7, 2016, the DNR forwarded the submission to the Great Lakes–St. Lawrence Water Resources Regional Body for review and the Great Lakes–St. Lawrence Water Resources Council for review and decision. Several environmental groups argued that the proposal, as presented, did not comply with Compact requirements and demanded a thorough review. The application was approved with conditions by the Compact Council on June 21, 2016.

== See also ==
- Canada–United States border
- Canada–United States relations
