= Rankin (surname) =

Rankin is a last name of Scottish and English origin, related to Rankine.

== Origins ==
The male given name "Rankin" was a diminutive form of the given name "Rand(e)" found in medieval Scotland and England, with the hypocoristic suffix "-kin" attached. The name is related to Randolph and other names. The first recorded instance of "Rankin" is in Scotland, with Rankin de Fowlartoun mentioned in Charters of the Royal Borough of Ayr in 1429.

The name was brought to Ireland by the Plantation of Ulster.

== People with the surname ==
People with the surname include:

- Alan Rankin, sound editor
- Annabelle Rankin, Australian senator
- Arabella Rankin, Scottish artist
- Arthur Rankin (disambiguation)
- Bobby Rankin (1905–1954), Scottish football player and manager
- Boyd Rankin, Irish cricketer
- Brian Robson Rankin (born 1941), stage name Hank Marvin, lead guitarist of the Shadows
- Chris Rankin, New Zealand actor
- Christopher Rankin, U.S. Representative from Mississippi
- Claire Rankin, Canadian actress
- Darrell Rankin (born 1957), leader of the Communist Party of Canada-Manitoba and peace activist
- David Rankin (disambiguation)
- Doris Rankin (1887–1947), American actress
- Frank Rankin, Canadian ice hockey player
- Gayle Rankin, Scottish actress
- George Rankin, Australian major general
- George Claus Rankin, Anglo-Indian judge
- Harry Rankin, Canadian lawyer
- Heather Rankin (singer) (born 1967), Canadian singer and actor, member of The Rankin Family music group
- Holly Rankin (born 1991), stage name Jack River, Australian singer-songwriter
- Isaiah Rankin, English footballer
- Ian Rankin (disambiguation)
- J. Lee Rankin, U.S. Solicitor General
- James Rankin (disambiguation)
- Jamilla Rankin (born 2003), Australian footballer
- Janice Rankin (born 1972), Scottish curler
- Jeannette Rankin (1880–1973), first female member of Congress, voted against entry into World War I, promoter of woman suffrage and social legislation, and the only member of Congress to vote against United States entry into World War II
- Jennifer Rankin (1941–1979), Australian poet and playwright
- John Rankin (disambiguation)
- Jon Rankin, Caymanian athlete
- Jordan Rankin, Australian rugby league footballer
- Judy Rankin, American golfer
- Kenny Rankin, American jazz singer
- Kevin Rankin (disambiguation)
- Kyle Rankin, American film director
- Lou Rankin, American sculptor
- Martinas Rankin, American football player
- Matthew Rankin, Canadian experimental filmmaker
- Melinda Rankin (1811–1888), American missionary, teacher, and writer
- Molly Rankin, lead singer of the indie pop band Alvvays
- Murray Rankin, Canadian lawyer, academic and politician
- Naomi Rankin, leader of the Communist Party of Alberta
- Nell Rankin, American opera singer
- Patricia Rankin, British particle physicist
- Paul Rankin, Irish celebrity chef, a mainstay of Ready Steady Cook
- Richard Rankin, Scottish actor
- Robert Rankin (disambiguation)
- Ron Rankin (1914–1991), Australian fighter ace and rugby union player
- Sue Rankin (born 1956), American academic
- John Gilbert "Tex" Rankin (1894–1947), American aviator
- Lt Col William Rankin (1920–2009), the only known person to survive a fall from the top of a cumulonimbus thunderstorm cloud

== See also ==
- Representative Rankin (disambiguation)
- Senator Rankin (disambiguation)
- Ranken
