= Ranking (surname) =

Ranking is a surname. Notable people with the surname include:

- John Ranking (1910–1959), English rower
- William Harcourt Ranking (1814–1867), English physician, medical editor, and photographer

== See also ==
- Rankin (surname)
- Rankine
