= Joseph Pescia Sullivan =

US Army officer (1894–1977)

Joseph P. Sullivan
- Born: 7 January 1894; San Francisco, California
- Died: 30 November 1977 (aged 83); Charleston, South Carolina
- Military career
- Branch: Infantry; Coast Artillery Corps; Quartermaster Corps
- Service years: 1917–1953
- Rank: Major General
- Service number: O-5328
- Conflicts: World War I; Battle of Saint-Mihiel; Meuse-Argonne offensive; Occupation of the Rhineland; World War II; Italian campaign; Korean War
- Awards: Legion of Merit (2); Army Distinguished Service Medal; Commendation Ribbon; Order of the British Empire; Grand Officer of the Order of the Crown of Italy; Silver Medal of Military Valor (Italy); Knight Grand Cross of the Sovereign Military Order of Malta (Vatican); Croix de Guerre 1939–1945 (France); Lateran Cross (Vatican)

Joseph Pescia Sullivan (7 January 1894 – 30 November 1977) was a United States Army major general. During the Second World War he commanded he was the chief quartermaster of the Fifth United States Army. During the Korean War, he was the chief quartermaster of the Far East Command.

== Early life ==
Joseph Pescia Sullivan was born in San Francisco, California, on 7 January 1894. He entered the United States Military Academy in West Point, New York, on 14 June 1913, and graduated early on 20 April 1920 due to World War I, ranked 131st in his class.

== World War I ==
Sullivan was commissioned as a second lieutenant 6th Infantry Regiment. He was promoted to first lieutenant on 15 May 1917 and temporary captain on 5 August 1917. After training at the Infantry School of Arms at Fort Sill, Oklahoma, embarked for France on 17 March 1918. He was attached to the French 143rd Infantry Regiment from 27 May to 15 August, when he rejoined the 6th Infantry. He saw action in the Battle of Saint-Mihiel and the Meuse-Argonne offensive before being severely wounded at Romagne-sous-Montfaucon on 16 October.

After being released from hospital on 7 November, Sullivan was sent to The Artillery School at Saumur. On 1 February 1919 he joined the 15th Field Artillery Regiment in the occupation of the Rhineland. When the regiment returned to the United States in June, he was posted to the General Staff in Paris. He returned to the United States on 20 July.

== Between the wars ==
Sullivan joined the 32nd Infantry Regiment at the Presidio of San Francisco, California, on 20 August 1919, and then the 44th Infantry Regiment there on 1 September. On 1 July 1920, he transferred to the Coast Artillery Corps at Fort Monroe, Virginia, from June 1921 to June 1922, and was a language officer at the United States embassy in Tokyo, Japan, from June 1922 to December 1923.

Sullivan joined the 63rd Coast Artillery (AA) Regiment at Fort Winfield Scott, California. He was an assistant staff judge advocate with the Ninth Corps Area at the Presidio of San Francisco from June 1928 to July 1927, before returning to the 63rd Coast Artillery. The regiment moved to Fort Shafter in the Territory of Hawaii in February 1928, and he was a trial judge advocate with the Hawaiian Department from June 1928 to August 1929.

On 2 August 1929, Sullivan transferred to the Quartermaster Corps and became the officer in charge of the Supplies Division in the Hawaiian General Depot. He was transferred to the Philadelphia in May 1931, and attended the Quartermaster School from 1 September 1931 to 1 September 1932. He then attended Harvard Business School, graduating with an Master of Business Administration degree in September 1934. While there, he was promoted to major on 20 March 1933. He was then post quartermaster at Fort Davis in the Panama Canal Zone until April 1936. He was quartermaster at the Atlantic Depot from 1936 to 1938, and then became the post quartermaster at Selfridge Field, Michigan. He was promoted to lieutenant colonel on 1 July 1940 and colonel on 8 April 1941.

== World War II ==
After the United States entry into World War II, he was assigned to the Office of the Quartermaster General (United States) from July to December 1942, when the commander of the newly organised Fifth United States Army, Lieutenant General Mark W. Clark, secured his services as the Army's quartermaster. The Fifth Army was located in North Africa at that time, but was committed to the Italian campaign. Over the next two years he dealt with the logistics of the Fifth Army's advance up the Italian peninsula. He was promoted to brigadier general on 20 February 1944. For his service, he was awarded the Legion of Merit, the Army Distinguished Service Medal and Commendation Ribbon, and foreign awards including the Order of the British Empire, Grand Officer of the Order of the Crown of Italy, the Italian Silver Medal of Military Valor, the Knight Grand Cross of the Sovereign Military Order of Malta, the French Croix de Guerre 1939–1945 and the Papal Lateran Cross.

== Later life ==
In July 1945, Sullivan became the chief quartermaster of the 15th Army Group in Austria. His rank of brigadier general in the wartime Army of the United States was terminated on 31 March 1946, and he reverted to his substantive rank of colonel in the Quartermaster Corps. In May 1947, he became quartermaster of the Sixth United States Army, with the rank of brigadier general again from 28 July 1948. In October 1948, he became commanding general of the Jeffersonville Quartermaster Depot. In November 1949, he became the quartermaster of Army Field Forces, based at Fort Monroe, Virginia. He was promoted to major general on 3 February 1950. He served under Clark again in the Korean War as Chief Quartermaster of the Far East Command from 1952 to 1953, after which he retired from the Army.

Sullivan was dean of The Citadel in Charleston, South Carolina, from 1954 to 1959. He died at his home in Charleston on 30 November 1977.

== Dates of rank ==
Insignia	Rank	Component	Date	Reference
	Second lieutenant	6th Infantry Regiment	20 April 1917	
	First lieutenant	6th Infantry Regiment	15 May 1917	
	Captain (temporary)	Infantry	5 August 1917	
	Captain (substantive)	Infantry	25 November 1919	
	Captain	Coast Artillery Corps	1 July 1920	
	Captain	Quartermaster Corps	2 August 1929	
	Major	Quartermaster Corps	20 March 1933	
	Lieutenant colonel	Quartermaster Corps	1 July 1940	
	Colonel	Army of the United States	8 April 1941	
	Brigadier general	Army of the United States	20 February 1944	
	Colonel	Quartermaster Corps	28 December 1945	
	Colonel (reverted)	Quartermaster Corps	21 March 1946	
	Brigadier general	Army of the United States	28 July 1948	
	Brigadier general	Regular Army	16 June 1949	
	Major general	Army of the United States	3 February 1950	
	Major general	Retired List	1953	
