= James Rankin =

James Rankin may refer to:

- Sir James Rankin, 1st Baronet (1842–1915), British member of parliament
- James Rankin (lighthouse keeper) (1844–1921), American lighthouse keeper
- James Palmer Rankin (1855–1934), physician and political figure in Ontario, Canada
- J. Lee Rankin (1907–1996), U.S. solicitor general
- James Rankin (RAF officer) (1913–1975), RAF flying ace during World War II
- James Rankin (Ohio politician) (1926–1978), Ohio House of Representatives
- James Rankin (footballer) (1927–1985), English footballer
- James Stuart Rankin (1880–1960), British member of parliament for Liverpool East Toxteth, 1916–1924
- James Rankin (badminton), Irish badminton player
- Jimmy Rankin (born 1964), Canadian country and folk artist
- USCGC James Rankin, a ship of the United States Coast Guard
