= Arthur Rankin =

Arthur Rankin may refer to:

- Arthur Rankin (surveyor) (1816–1893), Canadian surveyor, entrepreneur, and politician
- Arthur Rankin Jr. (1924–2014), American producer, director, and writer
- Arthur E. Rankin (1888–1962), American teacher and politician
- Arthur Rankin (actor) (1895–1947), American actor
- Arthur Rankin (footballer) (1904–1962), Scottish footballer

== See also ==
- Arthur Ranken (1806–1886), Dean of Aberdeen and Orkney
