= Robert Rankin (disambiguation) =

Robert Rankin (born 1949) is a British science fiction and fantasy author.

Robert Rankin may also refer to:

- Bob Rankin (born 1969), American politician
- Bobby Rankin (1905–1954), Scottish footballer
- Robert Rankin (timber merchant) (1801–1870), Scottish-Canadian timber merchant and shipowner
- Robert Alexander Rankin (1915–2001), Scottish mathematician
- Robert William Rankin (1907–1942), Australian naval officer
- Robert Rankin (Australian politician) (1896–1955), Australian politician
- Sir Robert Rankin, 1st Baronet (1877–1960), British Member of Parliament for Liverpool Kirkdale, 1931–1945
- Robert J. Rankin (1915–2013), American flying ace during World War II
- Robert L. Rankin (1939–2014), American linguist and scholar of the Siouan languages
- Robert Rankin (Australian wilderness photographer) (born 1951)
