= USCGC James Rankin =

Keeper-class coastal buoy tender of the United States Coast Guard

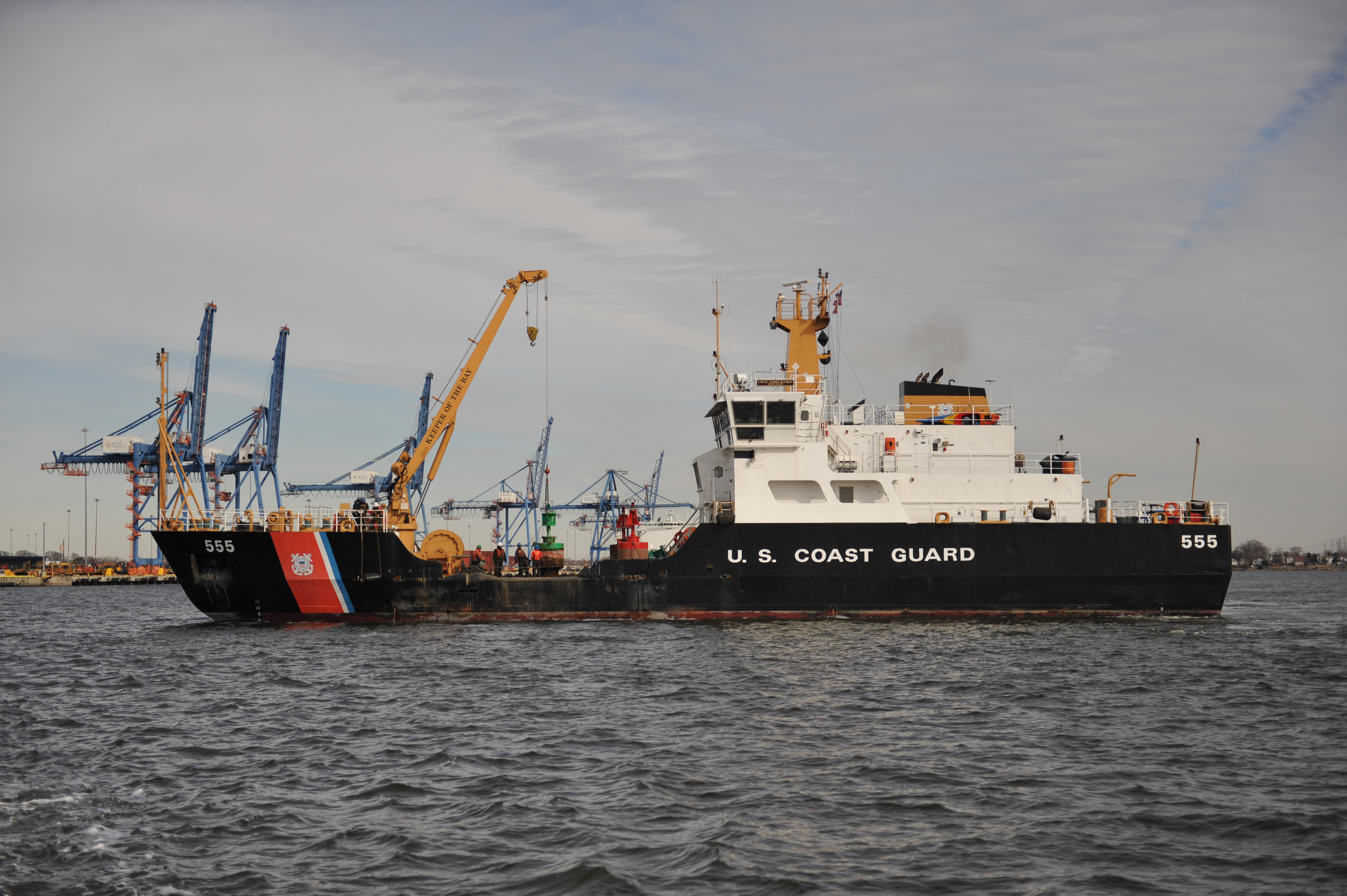
- USCGC James Rankin in Baltimore Harbor

History

United States
- Name: James Rankin
- Operator: US Coast Guard
- Builder: Marinette Marine Corporation
- Launched: 25 April 1998
- Commissioned: 1 May 1999
- Home port: Baltimore, Maryland
- Identification: IMO number: 9177234; Call sign: NUVD; MMSI number: 368777000
- Motto: Keeper of the Bay
- Status: Active
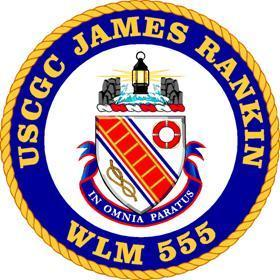
- Badge

General characteristics
- Type: Keeper-class buoy tender
- Displacement: 850 long tons (864 t) full load
- Length: 175 ft (53.3 m)
- Beam: 36 ft (11.0 m)
- Draft: 8 ft (2.4 m)
- Installed power: 2,000 hp (1,500 kW) sustained
- Propulsion: 2 × Caterpillar 3508 DITA Diesel engines; bow thruster, 500 hp (373 kW)
- Speed: 12 knots (22 km/h; 14 mph)
- Range: 2000 nautical miles at 10 kn
- Crew: 24 (2 Officers, 22 Enlisted)

USCGC James Rankin (WLM-555) is a Keeper-class coastal buoy tender of the United States Coast Guard. Launched in 1998, she is home-ported at the Coast Guard Yard in Baltimore, Maryland. Her primary mission is maintaining 361 aids to navigation in Upper Chesapeake Bay and its tributaries including the Eastern Shore of Maryland, the Potomac River, and the Annapolis area. Secondary missions include marine environmental protection, light icebreaking, search and rescue, and security. She is assigned to the Fifth Coast Guard District.

== Construction and characteristics ==
On 22 June 1993 the Coast Guard awarded the contract for the Keeper-class vessels to Marinette Marine Corporation in the form of a firm order for the lead ship and options for thirteen more. The Coast Guard exercised options for the 5th through 10th ships of the class, including James Rankin in February 1997. The ship was launched on 25 April 1998 into the Menominee River. James Rankin is the fifth of the fourteen Keeper-class ships built.

Her hull was built of welded steel plates. She is 175 feet (53 m) long, with a beam of 36 feet (11 m), and a full-load draft of 8 feet (2.4 m). James Rankin displaces 850 long tons fully loaded. Her gross register tonnage is 904, and her net register tonnage is 271. The top of the mast is 58.75 feet (17.91 m) above the waterline.

Rather than building the ship from the keel up as a single unit, Marinette Marine used a modular fabrication approach. Eight large modules, or "hull blocks" were built separately and then welded together.

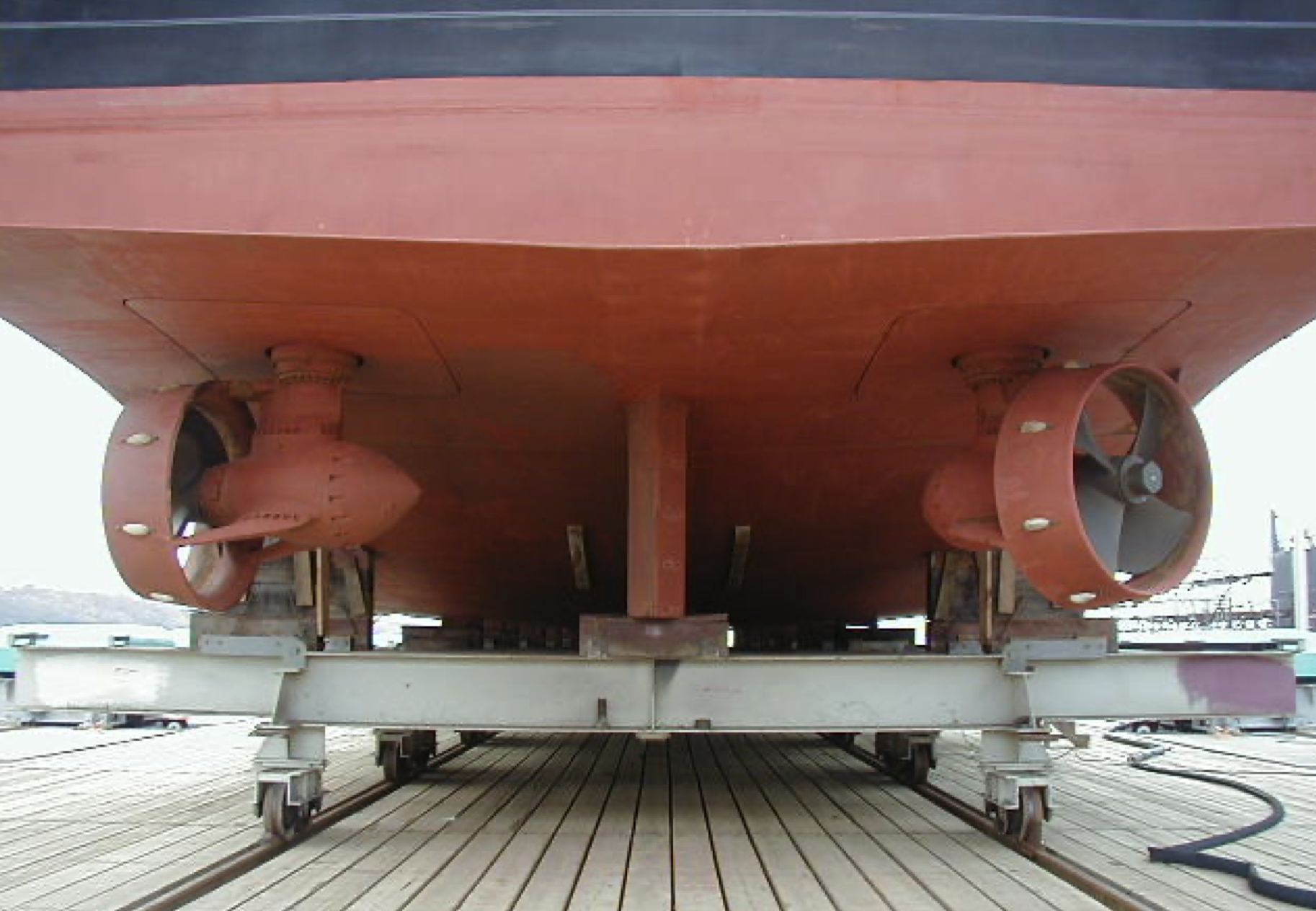
Z-drives on a Keeper-class ship

The ship has two Caterpillar 3508 DITA (direct-injection, turbocharged, aftercooled) 8-cylinder Diesel engines which produce 1000 horsepower each. These drive two Ulstein Z-drives. Keeper-class ships were the first Coast Guard cutters equipped with Z-drives, which markedly improved their maneuverability. The Z-drives have four-bladed propellers which are 57.1 inches (145 cm) in diameter and are equipped with Kort nozzles. They can be operated in "tiller mode" where the Z-drives turn in the same direction to steer the ship, or in "Z-conn mode" where the two Z-drives can turn in different directions to achieve specific maneuvering objectives. An implication of the Z-drives is that there is no reverse gear or rudder aboard James Rankin. In order to back the ship, the Z-drives are turned 180 degrees which drives the ship stern-first even though the propellers are spinning in the same direction as they do when the ship is moving forward. Her maximum speed is 12 knots. Her tanks can hold 16,385 gallons of diesel fuel which gives her an unrefueled range of 2,000 nautical miles at 10 knots.

She has a 500 horsepower bow thruster. The Z-drives and bow thruster can be linked in a Dynamic Positioning System. This gives James Rankin the ability to hold position in the water even in heavy currents, winds, and swells. This advanced capability is useful in bringing buoys aboard that can weigh more than 16,000 lbs.

Electrical power aboard is provided by three Caterpillar 3406 DITA generators which produce 285 Kw each. She also has a 210 Kw emergency generator, which is a Caterpillar 3406 DIT.

The buoy deck has 1,335 square feet (124.0 m^{2}) of working area. A crane with a boom 42 feet (13 m) long lifts buoys and their mooring anchors onto the deck. The crane can lift up to 20,000 pounds (9,100 kg).

The ships' fresh water tanks can hold 7,339 gallons. She has three ballast tanks that can be filled to maintain their trim, and tanks for oily waste water, sewage, gray water, new lubrication oil, and waste oil.

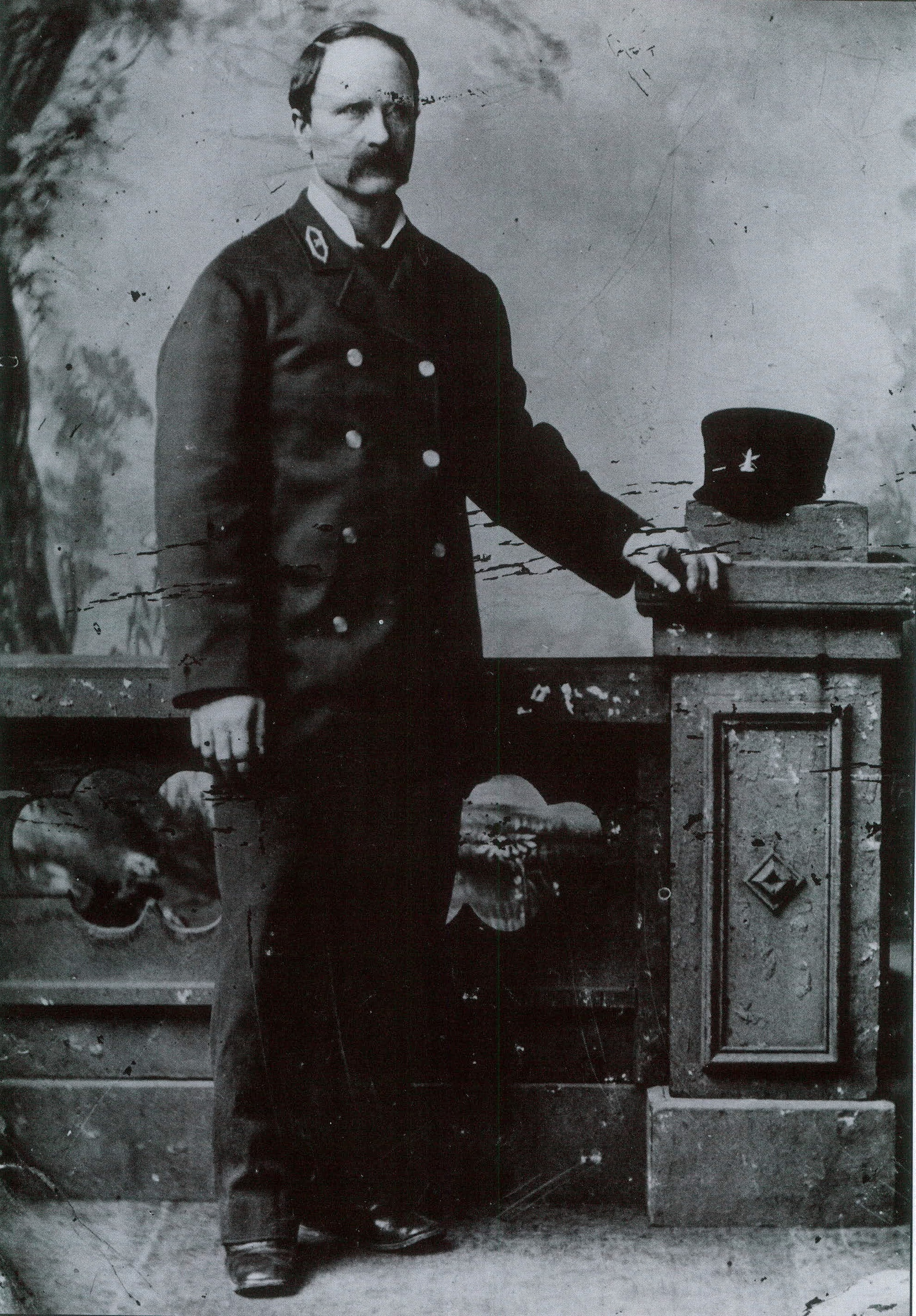
Lighthouse Keeper James Rankin

Accommodations were designed for mixed gender crews from the start. Crew size and composition has varied over the years. When she was commissioned, her complement was 18 sailors, commanded by a chief warrant officer.

James Rankin, as all Keeper-class ships, has a strengthened "ice belt" along the waterline so that she can work on aids to navigation in ice-infested waters. Not only is the hull plating in the ice belt thicker than the rest of the hull, but framing members are closer together in areas that experience greater loads when working in ice. Higher grades of steel were used for hull plating in the ice belt to prevent cracking in cold temperatures. Her bow is sloped so that rather than smashing into ice, she rides up over it to break it with the weight of the ship. James Rankin is capable of breaking flat, 9-inch thick ice at 3 knots. Despite her relatively southerly basing, James Rankin has been called upon for light ice breaking to keep commerce moving in Chesapeake Bay.

The ship carries a cutter boat on davits. She was originally equipped with a CB-M boat which was replaced in the mid-2010s with a CB-ATON-M boat. This was built by Metal Shark Aluminum Boats and was estimated to cost $210,000. The boat is 18 feet (5.5 m) long and are equipped with a Mercury Marine inboard/outboard diesel engine.

The ship's namesake is lighthouse keeper James Rankin. He was the lighthouse keeper at the Fort Point light near San Francisco from 1878 until 1919. He is credited with saving the lives of 18 people during his tenure.

James Rankin replaced USCGC Red Birch, which was decommissioned in 1998.

== Operational history ==
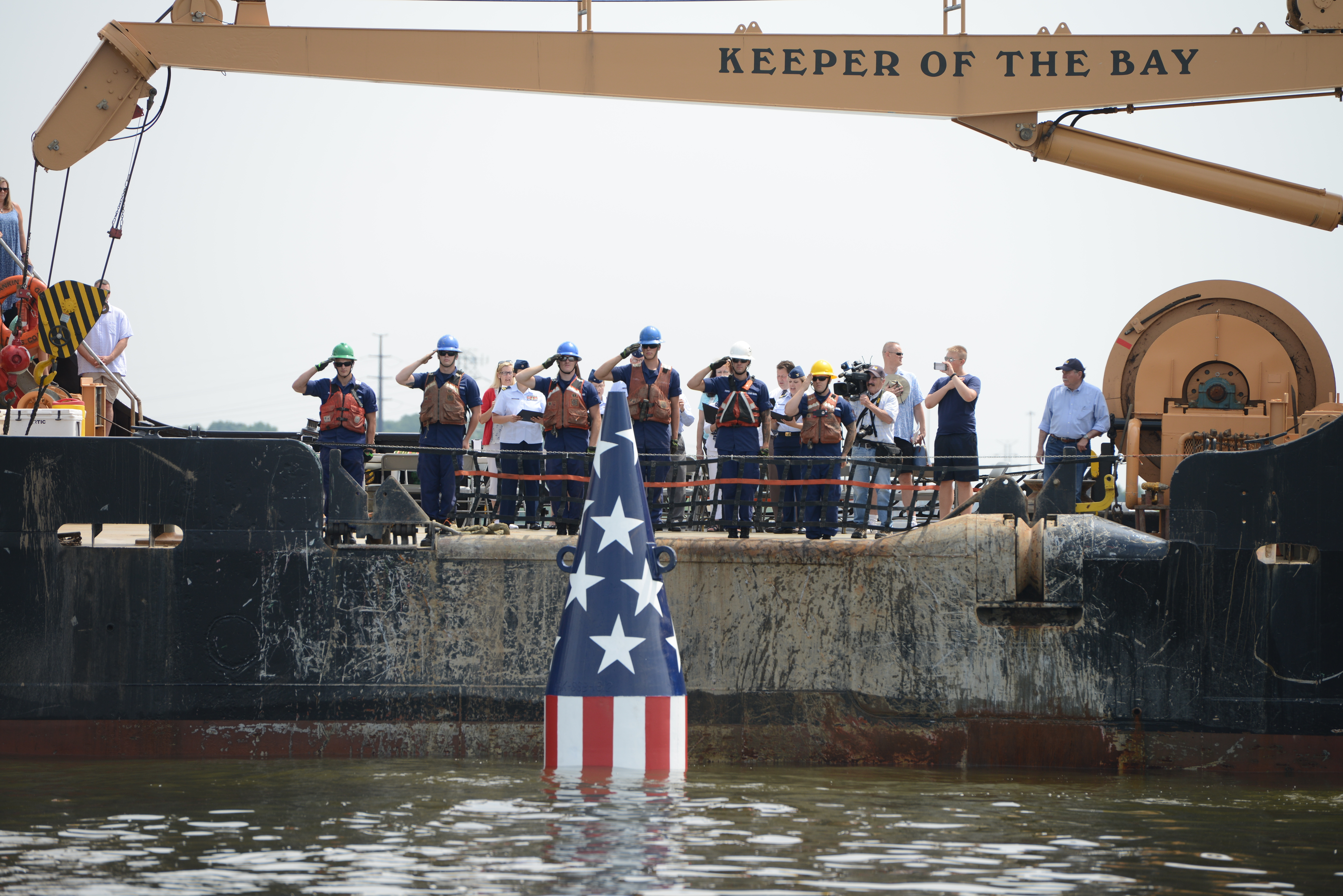
James Rankin sets the "Francis Scott Key" buoy

James Rankin was accepted by the Coast Guard and placed in "commissioned, special" status on 26 August 1998. She left Marinette on 26 September 1998 and sailed through the Great Lakes to reach her new home port in Baltimore, making numerous stops along the way. She was placed in full commission at a ceremony on 1 May 1999 which was presided over by Vice-Admiral Roger T. Rufe, commander of the Fifth Coast Guard District. Her first official mission after commissioning was placing the "Francis Scott Key" buoy marking the spot where Key witnessed the bombardment of Fort McHenry described in the Star-Spangled Banner.

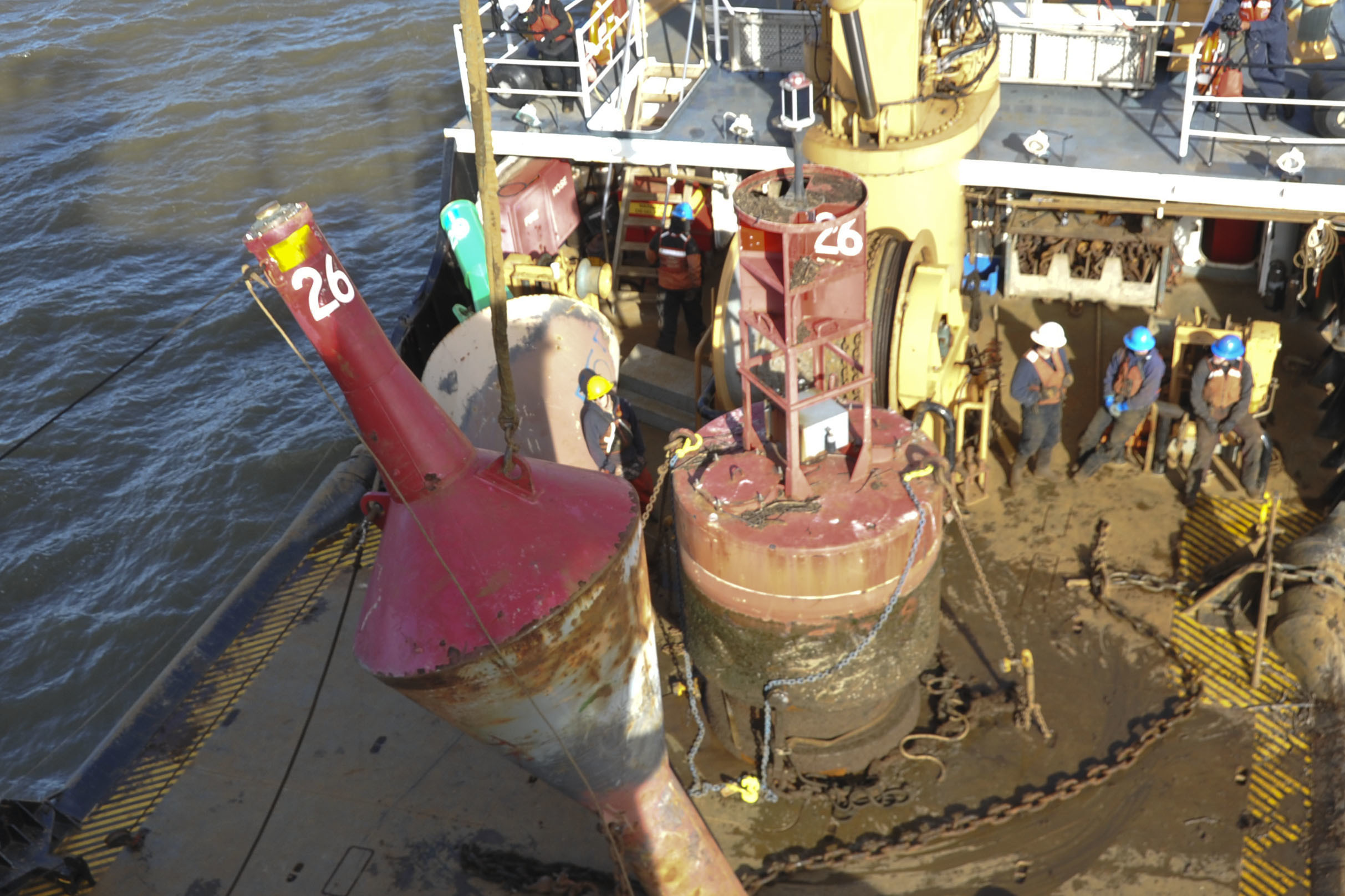
James Rankin exchanges seasonal buoys

James Rankin's buoy tending involves lifting them onto her deck where marine growth is scraped and pressure washed off, inspecting the buoy itself, and replacing lights, solar cells, and radar transponders. The mooring chain or synthetic cable is inspected and replaced as needed. The concrete block mooring anchor is also inspected. Portions of James Rankin's buoy fleet are prone to damage from snow and ice, requiring swapping larger summer buoys with less vulnerable winter buoys in the fall, and then back again in the spring. In December 2019, for example, she replaced 66 summer buoys.

The bulk of James Rankin's year is spent at sea tending its buoys, or in port maintaining the ship. She has been asked to perform other missions, as described below.

=== Marine environmental protection ===
The barge Pequeco II sank at the mouth to the Elk River with 2 million pounds of sodium silicate aboard. In March 2000, James Rankin participated in the successful salvage and removal of the barge.

James Rankin was deployed to the Gulf of Mexico in 2010 to respond to the Deepwater Horizon oil spill. She used the Vessel of Opportunity Skimming System to recover oil from the surface.

=== Security ===
After the September 11, 2001 terrorist attacks, the Coast Guard closed a portion of the Potomac River near sensitive sites in Washington, D.C. James Rankin was dispatched to patrol the river and enforce the closure.

In May 2006, the ship served as a training base for 60 firefighters training to extinguish ship fires.

The ship was responsible for keeping pleasure boats out from under the Blue Angels aerobatic show over Baltimore Harbor in September 2014.

=== Public engagement ===
The Coast Guard has offered tours aboard James Rankin on several occasions. These include:

- En route from Marinette to Baltimore in 1998 the ship made numerous stops and gave tours to thousands of people. Stops included Green Bay, Milwaukee, Cleveland, Chicago, Ogdensburg, Boston, and Escanaba.
- Maryland Fleet Week in 2022.

The ship has participated in recruiting/educational events. For example, in 2010, the ship hosted 33 cadets from the Navy Junior Reserve Officers Training Corps on their first cruise on an active-duty ship.

== Awards and honors ==
James Rankin was honored with a Coast Guard Unit Commendation in April 2003, and Coast Guard Meritorious Unit Commendations in 2001 and 2007.
