= Tlaquepaque (Sedona) =

Tlaquepaque Arts and Shopping Village

- View southeast across Patio del Norte (North Patio) in 2026
- Location: Sedona, Arizona, U.S.
- Coordinates: 34.86260°N 111.76310°W
- Address: 336 Arizona State Route 179
- Opened: 1973 (53 years ago)
- Architect: Bob McIntyre
- Num. of stores: 63 (as of 2023)
- Website: www.tlaq.com

Tlaquepaque is a shopping and business complex in Sedona, Arizona, United States. Located on both the northern and southern sides of State Route 179 (SR 179), as it crosses Oak Creek (a tributary of the Verde River), it was founded in 1973 by Abe Miller (1912–1982) as an artists' commune. The land on which Tlaquepaque stands was a sycamore grove owned by Harry and Ruby Girard. What is now known as Tlaquepaque South opened in 1973, while Tlaquepaque North opened in 2017.

As of 2023, Tlaquepaque contained eighteen art galleries and forty-five shops, while its chapel has been mooted for historical landmark status. Sculptor Lou Rankin formerly owned a gallery at Tlaquepaque.

In 2023, Sedona City Council approved a $3.46 million contract to install a pedestrian underpass beneath SR 179 and between the two sections of Tlaquepaque. It opened the following year.

== Squares ==
Tlaquepaque South has six named squares:

- Patio del Norte (North Patio)
- Patio de las Campañas (Patio of the Bells)
- Patio de las Rosas (Patio of the Roses)
- Patio de la Capilla (Patio of the Chapel)
- Patio Azul (Blue Patio)

== Gallery ==
Looking south across Patio de las Campañas

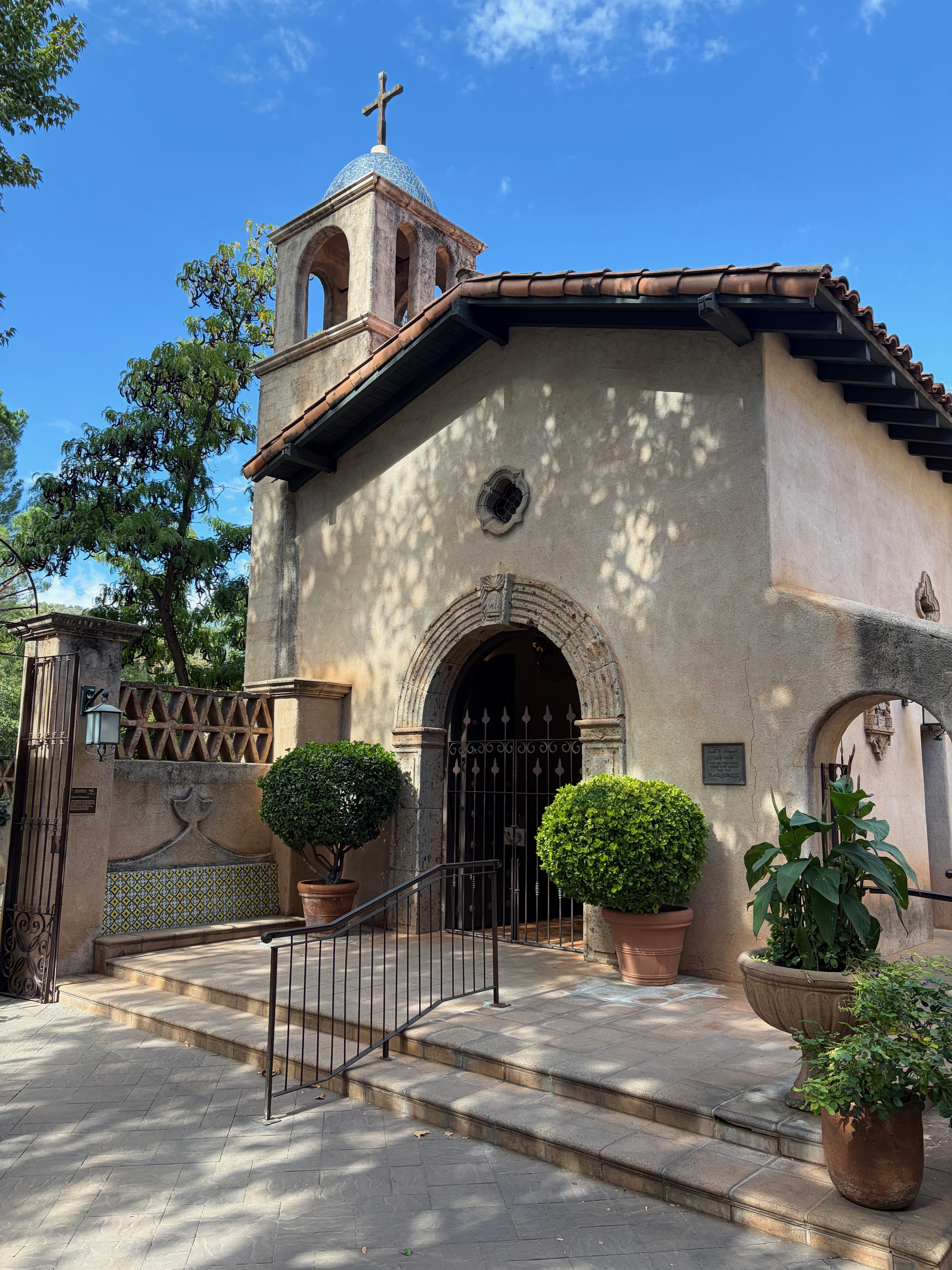
Tlaquepaque wedding chapel in 2025
