= Ian Rankin (disambiguation) =

Ian Rankin (born 1960) is a Scottish crime author.

Ian Rankin may also refer to

- Ian Rankin (footballer) (born 1979), Scottish footballer
- Iain Rankin (born 1983), Canadian politician
- Ian Rankin (rugby union), Scottish rugby union coach
- Ian Niall Rankin (1932–2020), 4th Baronet
