= James Rankin (footballer) =

English footballer

Personal information
- Full name: James Rankin
- Date of birth: 8 September 1927
- Place of birth: Gateshead, England
- Date of death: 1985 (aged 57–58)
- Position: Winger

Senior career*
Years	Team	Apps	(Gls)
1944–1949	Newcastle United	0	(0)
1949–1950	Brighton & Hove Albion	0	(0)
1950–1951	Grimsby Town	5	(1)
- * Club domestic league appearances and goals

James Rankin (8 September 1927 – 1985) was an English professional footballer who played as a winger.
