= Fort Point Light (San Francisco) =

Lighthouse in California, United States

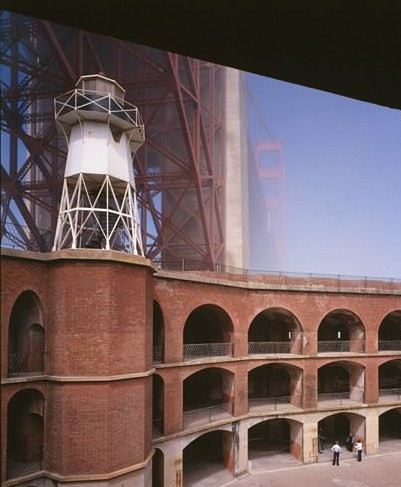
- Fort Point Light
- Location: just below the Golden Gate Bridge; San Francisco; California; United States
- Coordinates: 37°48′38″N 122°28′38.4″W

Tower
- Constructed: 1855 (first)
- Foundation: brick and granite third system fortification
- Construction: cast iron skeletal tower
- Height: 27 feet (8.2 m)
- Shape: nonagonal frustum skeletal tower with balcony and lantern
- Markings: white tower, black lantern
- Operator: Fort Point National Historic Site

Light
- First lit: 1864 (current)
- Deactivated: 1934
- Focal height: 110 feet (34 m)
- Lens: Fourth order Fresnel lens (1864) (removed)
- Characteristic: Fl WR 5s.

Fort Point Light is a decommissioned lighthouse built on the third tier of Fort Point, which is now directly beneath the south anchorage of the Golden Gate Bridge in San Francisco, California. The lighthouse is at the south end of the narrowest part of Golden Gate strait. It was preceded by two other lighthouses in nearby locations. The present lighthouse was in operation from 1864 until 1934.

== Structures ==
There have been three lighthouses built in the area where Fort Point stands today.

The original lighthouse, built in 1853, was a Cape Cod style lighthouse with an integral tower. It was the second lighthouse to be built on the US west coast, but it stood for only three months, and was never lit. While awaiting the arrival of its lens (from Paris), it was torn down to make room for the Army fort.

The second lighthouse at Fort Point was a squat wooden 36-foot (11 m) tower with four sides that sloped up to a square watch room. It was built on the narrow ledge between the fort and the water. In 1855, the light behind its fourth-order Fresnel lens was lit for the first time. Erosion undermined its foundation, and in 1863 it was torn down to make way for a bigger seawall.

Fort Point's third lighthouse was built atop the wall of the fort in 1864. It was built as a 27-foot (8.2 m) iron skeleton tower with a spiral staircase. A fifth-order lens was originally fitted, but in 1902 the lens was upgraded to a fourth-order lens, which produced alternating white and red flashes.

In 1933, when work on the Golden Gate Bridge began, a fog signal and navigational light were placed at the base of the bridge's south tower. On September 1, 1934, after the towers for the Golden Gate Bridge were completed, the lighthouse was deactivated. The bridge would block off much of the light from the lighthouse, and as the towers were 740 feet (226 m) tall, they provided a more visible warning for mariners.

== Keepers ==
Early keepers of Fort Point Light included:

- B. F. Deane (1855-?)
- J. C. Frachey (?)
- George D. Wise (1860)
- Henry Hickson (1860-?)
- John D. Jenkins (?-1863)
- George W. Omey (1863)
- Scott Blanchard (1864–1866)
- R. S. Martin (1866–1869)
- Frank Thompson (1869–1871)
- J. T. Hule (1871–1878)
- James Rankin (1878–1919)
- George D. Cobb (lighthouse keeper) (?-1939)
- The Mc Kay Family were the last to occupy the lighthouse keepers cottage.

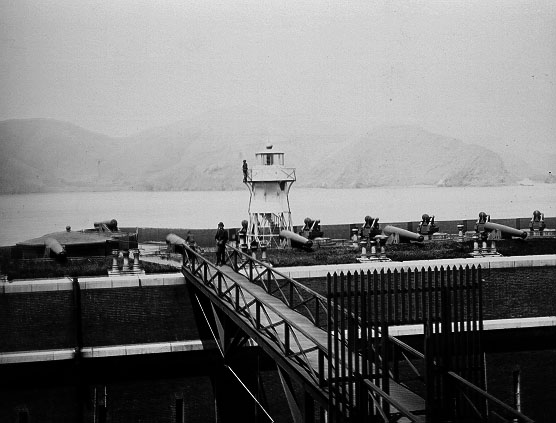
Fort Point Light amidst naval artillery rifles – U.S. Coast Guard Archive

Assistant keepers included:

- Ephrin Sohn (1856-?)
- Return J. Henter (1857–1859)
- George D. Wise (1858–1860)
- D. Dennison (1860)
- G. W. Thomas (1860)
- James Gormley (1860-?)
- James Jenkins (1860-?)
- James Heron (1860-?)
- C. H. Warren (?)
- G. W. Omey (?-1863)
- G. A. Braley (1863)
- J. J. Wickersham (1863–1865)
- Ann Blanchard (1865–1866)
- William Ferry (1866–1867)
- Mrs. Rachel L. Jones (1867–1868)
- Theresa Welch (1868)
- F. B. Morehouse (1868–1869)
- Mrs. Mary Thompson (1869–1871)
- Sophie Hule (1874–1878)
- John Riley (1878–1879)
- H. P. McKeever (1879)
- Frank P. Stanyan (1879)

== See also ==
- List of lighthouses in the United States
