= 63rd Coast Artillery (United States) =

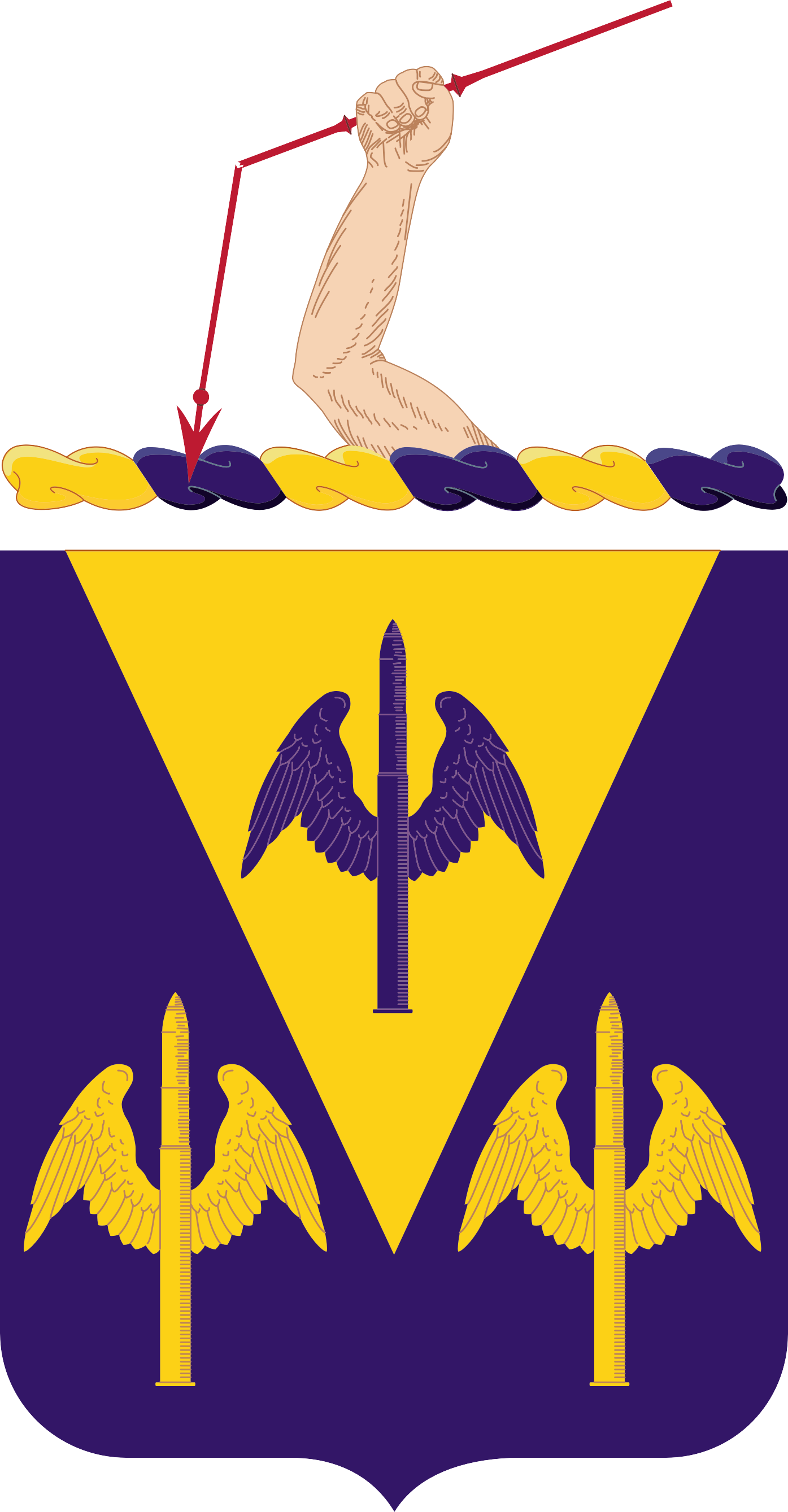
- Coat of arms
- Active: 1917 - 1943
- Country: United States
- Branch: Coast Artillery Corps
- Type: Anti aircraft
- Size: Regiment
- Motto(s): AMOR PATRIAE (The Love Of Country)
- Mascot(s): Oozlefinch

Commanders
- Notable commanders: Colonel

The 63rd Coast Artillery was a Coast Artillery regiment in the United States Army. It was deactivated and broken up in 1943, with its last descendants inactivated in 1958.

== Lineage ==
The regiment was constituted and organized 10 December 1917 as 63rd Artillery (CAC) at Fort Worden, Wa. Shipped to Camp Mills June 1918, arrived in France 14 July 1918. and assigned to 39th Brigade CAC. returned to Camp Mills February 1919, demobilized at Camp Lewis 21 March 1919.

- Reactivated as 3rd Artillery Battalion (AA), (CAC), constituted 12 September 1921 and organized 16 September 1921 at Fort Winfield Scott as follows-
- HHD&CT
- Searchlight Battery
- Gun Battery
- Machinegun Battery.

Redesignated 63rd Antiaircraft Battalion,(CAC) 1 June 1922 and companies given serial numbers as follows-

- HHD&CT as 259th Company (CAC)
- Searchlight Battery as 260th Company
- Gun Battery as 261st Company
- Machinegun Battery as 262nd Company.

Redesignated 63rd Coast Artillery (AA) Regiment on 1 July 1924 and reorganized as follows-

- HHD&CT as HHC
- Searchlight Battery as A Battery
- Gun Battery as B Battery
- Machinegun Battery as C Battery Reorganized as Gun Battery and deactivated.
- D Battery
- E Battery (antiaircraft machinegun battery)
- F Battery
- G Battery
- H Battery

63rd Artillery (CAC) reconstituted and consolidated with 63rd Coast Artillery (AA) Regiment 7 March 1932. 2nd Battalion activated at Fort MacArthur 12 October 1939. Regiment reassigned to Fort Bliss 6 December 1940.

- Composite Automatic Weapons Battery organized from elements of the regiment on 23 March 1941 and assigned to Camp Clatsop, Oregon 6 April 1941 for deployment to U.S. Naval Base Sitka. battery disbanded at Sitka 1 July 1941.

regiment assigned to Louisiana Maneuvers 11 August 1941 to 28 September 1941.

- Regiment transferred to Seattle 15 December 1941 and assigned to 39th Coast Artillery (AA) Brigade. 3rd Battalion constituted and activated 27 May 1942.

Deactivated at Seattle on 10 September 1943 and broken up as follows-

- HHB redesignated as HHB 63rd AAA Group
- 1st Battalion redesignated 63rd AAA Gun Battalion
- 2nd Battalion redesignated 213th AAA (AW) Battalion
- 3rd Battalion redesignated 243rd AAA (Searchlight) Battalion

63rd AAA Gun Battalion inactivated 10 March 1947 at Okinawa. Reactivated 15 November 1949 at Fort Bliss, Texas. Redesignated 1 October 1953 as 63rd Antiaircraft Artillery Battalion.

- reorganized and redesignated as 63rd Antiaircraft Artillery Missile Battalion 8 October 1957.

Inactivated 1 September 1958 in Germany.

== Distinctive unit insignia ==
- Description

A Gold color metal and enamel device 1 1/2 inches (3.8 cm) in height overall consisting of a shield blazoned: Purple a pile Or, three winged projectiles one and two counterchanged. Attached below and to the sides of the shield a Gold scroll inscribed “AMOR PATRIAE” in Purple letters.

- Symbolism

The shield is the heraldic representation of the golden gate, the yellow opening of the setting sun and the two purple headlands and thereon are three antiaircraft winged projectiles. The motto translates to “The Love Of Country.”

- Background

The distinctive unit insignia was originally approved for the 63d Antiaircraft Battalion on 30 January 1924. It was redesignated for the 63d Antiaircraft Artillery Gun Battalion on 30 October 1951. The insignia was redesignated for the 63d Antiaircraft Artillery Battalion on 22 May 1956.

== Coat of arms ==
=== Blazon ===
- Shield

Purple a pile Or, three winged projectiles one and two counterchanged.

- Crest

On a wreath of the colors Or and Purple, a dexter arm embowed Proper holding a broken lance Gules. Motto: AMOR PATRIAE (The Love Of Country).

=== Symbolism ===
- Shield

The shield is the heraldic representation of the golden gate, the yellow opening of the setting sun and the two purple headlands and thereon are three antiaircraft winged projectiles.

- Crest

The crest is the crest of General Winfield Scott for whom one of the forts was named and indicates the place of activation after World War I. The motto is also that of the Scott family.

=== Background ===
The coat of arms was originally approved for the 3d Antiaircraft Battalion on 16 December 1921. It was redesignated for the 63d Antiaircraft Battalion on 4 October 1922. It was redesignated for the 63d Coast Artillery Regiment on 1 May 1924. It was redesignated for the 63d Antiaircraft Artillery Gun Battalion on 18 December 1944. The insignia was redesignated for the 63d Antiaircraft Artillery Battalion on 22 May 1956.

== Campaign streamers ==
World War I

- Streamer without inscription

World War II

- Pacific Theater without inscription
