= Robert Rankin (photographer) =

Australian photographer and writer

- Born: Robert Osmond Rankin; 1 April 1951 (age 75); Brisbane, Queensland, Australia
- Website: https://www.rankin.com.au/

Robert Rankin is an Australian landscape photographer and filmmaker. Rankin's published photography, filmmaking, and guidebooks raise awareness of the importance of wilderness conservation and promote interest in bushwalking throughout Australia.

== Education ==
As a student at the University of Queensland (UQ), Rankin completed a Bachelor of Science (BSc) in physics and a Master of Science (MSc) in environmental physics. Rankin was employed from 1972 to 1976 as a tutor in the UQ Physics Department.

Rankin joined the university's bushwalking club (UQBWC) in 1970, where he developed a knowledge of the mountainous regions of South East Queensland, the Scenic Rim in particular. In early 1972, Rankin flew over and photographed Lake Pedder in Tasmania, a few months before the enlarged lake was flooded for hydro-electric power generation. One of these aerial photographs is included in a collection of photos of the lake taken on this trip. He returned in January 1973 as the original lake was disappearing under the floodwaters of the Serpentine Dam.

After four years as a producer and director of educational television programs, Rankin left the ABC in 1981 to take up a scholarship for a Doctor of Philosophy degree at Griffith University to investigate ways of improving the design of visual graphics in science communication. The PhD was awarded in 1986.

== Filmmaking ==
In 1975, Rankin received a federal government grant through the Australia Council and the Australian Film Institute to film a documentary about Hinchinbrook Island in North Queensland. With a group of six, he climbed and filmed the ascent, over three days, of the South East Ridge of the Thumb. The film, Climb to the Clouds (1975), was subsequently sold to a Queensland television company. After the Australian Broadcasting Corporation (ABC) passed on Rankin's proposal to film an ascent of the East Face of Crookneck in the Glasshouse Mountains north of Brisbane because of the difficult challenges involved in filming on a vertical cliff, Rankin made the decision to finance and produce the film himself. The subsequent film, To Walk the Vertical (1976) was sold back to the ABC.

In 1977, the Wales (now Westpac) Bank commissioned Rankin to produce the film Walk with Safety, depicting safe bushwalking and camping practices. In August 1977, Rankin shot a short film, Ice is Nice, presenting the mid-winter in the extreme environment of Mount Kosciuszko in the Snowy Mountains. The film's historic footage from 1977 was later incorporated into The Snowiest, from the Wilderness Experience Vol 7 DVD.

In Queensland in the 1970s, Rankin was one of several film producers involved in outdoor adventure-oriented 16mm film making. The Mystique of Hinchinbrook again looked at Hinchinbrook Island in more recent times (2007). Jewels of the South West described a 6-day solo trip by Rankin into south-west Tasmania to film the glacial lakes of the Western Arthur Range and lament the flooding of the largest lake in the region, Lake Pedder, for power generation. Other films included Secrets of the Scenic Rim, Federation Peak, South East Queensland, Climbing Barney, TASMANIA - An Alluring Landscape and others.

== Book publishing ==
Rankin's publishing company, Rankin Publishers, produced a range of products under the Australia's Wilderness brand, based on Rankin's photographs, videos, music and writing. Rankin Publishers released the Queensland's Scenic Rim Wilderness Calendar 1981, Australian Wilderness Skills (1983) and On the Edge of Wilderness (1983), the latter showcasing wilderness regions surrounding the city of Brisbane. Classic Wild Walks of Australia (1989), also printed in Brisbane its content released later on CD-ROM, and described by the Sydney Morning Herald as the "best of its kind" in Australia. Also in 1989, William Heinemann Australia chose two of Rankin's images for the front and back covers of a publication on the Snowy Mountains. Wilderness Light (1993), was a discussion of his work.

Rankin has published different titles including books, prints, music CDs, short films, DVDs, and software. Within the first year of publishing, Rankin has sold as many as 30,000 calendars, diaries, and boxed cards. As of 2026, Rankin sells up to 100,000 copies annually. Simon and Matthews cite Rankin's calendars in discussing the way "images of wilderness in everyday use provoke the question of how sentimental attachments toward landscapes might prompt environmental awareness and action". Connell and Gibson, discussing the absence of "realities of Australian “nature”—salinity, old growth logging, bleaching of coral from pollution, soil erosion in marginal landscapes—are not surprisingly absent, replaced instead by an idyllic nature free from human influence", use Rankin's Wilderness CD of 1994 as an example.

== Mountaineering ==
In 2011, Rankin climbed the Gran Paradiso (4061m) in Italy, and Mont Blanc (4809m) in France in 2012 at the age of 61. He has also hiked in Yosemite National Park in the United States and the Dolomites in Italy.

== Personal life ==
Rankin lives in Brisbane with his partner Carmel Keating and their son.

== Works ==
=== Published books ===
- 1983 - Australian Wilderness Skills, Robert Rankin Publishing, Brisbane. (paperback) ISBN 978 0 9592418 0 8
- 1983 - On the Edge of Wilderness, Robert Rankin Publishing, Brisbane. (hardback) ISBN 978 0 9592418 1 5
- 1989, 1990, 1995, 1999 - Classic Wild Walks of Australia, Rankin Publishers, Brisbane. (hardback) ISBN 978 0 9592418 2 2
- 1992, 2015, 2016 - Secrets of the Scenic Rim, Rankin Publishers, Brisbane. (paperback) ISBN 978 0 9874938 5 9
- 1993 - Wilderness Light, Rankin Publishers, Brisbane. (hardback) ISBN 978 0 9592418 4 6
- 2002 - Beyond the Horizon, Rankin Publishers, Brisbane. (hardback) ISBN 978 0 9592418 6 0
- 2011 - Australia – Wild Places, Rankin Publishers, Brisbane. (hardback) ISBN 978 0 9592418 8 4
- 2011 - Einstein's Relativity, Rankin Publishers, Brisbane. (paperback) ISBN 978 0 9592418 7 7
- 2012 - Australia – Mountains, Rankin Publishers, Brisbane. (hardback) ISBN 978 0 9592418 9 1
- 2013 - Australia – Forest to Sea, Rankin Publishers, Brisbane. (hardback) ISBN 978 0 9874938 0 4
- 2018 - Tasmania – Wilderness Walks, Rankin Publishers, Brisbane. (paperback) ISBN 978 0 987 4938 6 6
- 2020 - Quantum Reality, Rankin Publishers, Brisbane. (paperback) ISBN 978 0 9874938 7 3
- 2023 - High Peaks of the Australian Alps, Rankin Publishers, Brisbane. (paperback) ISBN 978 0 6455771 2 9

=== Films ===
- Climb to the Clouds (1975)
- To Walk the Vertical (1976)
- Walk with Safety (1978)
- Ice is Nice (1978)
- Secrets of the Scenic Rim 1991 (1991)
- Jewels of the South West (2006)
- Climbing Barney (2006)
- The Mystique of Hinchinbrook (2007)
- The Walk to Everest (2010)
- Federation Peak (2011)
- In the European Alps (2012)
- South East Queensland (2017)
- Secrets of the Scenic Rim (2017)
- Tasmania - An Alluring Landscape (2019)

=== ABC educational documentaries ===
- Brisbane's River (1978)
- Canungra (1980)
- Ingham (1979)
- Earth, Wind, Fire and Rain (1979)
- The Rainforest (1978)
- The Eucalypt Forest (1980)
- Forces (1979)
- Energy (1980)
- Waves (1981)

=== DVDs ===
- Wilderness Experience (7 Volumes) (2004 – 2012)
- The Rim - Landscapes of the Scenic Rim (2006) ISBN 978-0-9874938-1-1
- The Mystique of Hinchinbrook (2007) ISBN 978-0-9874938-3-5
- South East Queensland – Wilderness Landscapes (2017) ISBN 978-0-9874938-4-2

=== Music CDs ===
- Visions of Wilderness (1994)
- Dreams of Wilderness (1994)
- Images of Australia (1996)
- Wild Land (2001)

=== Software ===
- Classic Wild Walks of Australia (Software Version). A comprehensive guide on disk to the wildest regions of Australia. ISBN 978-0-9592418-5-3
- Australian Wilderness Diary and Screen Saver
- Australian Wild Scenes Screen Saver (Rainforest and Wilderness Collection)
