= James Rankin (lighthouse keeper) =

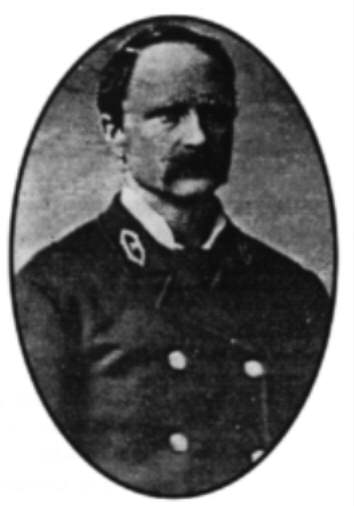
- A photo of James Rankin from the US Coast Guard
- Born: February 20, 1844; Killashee, County Longford, Ireland
- Died: January 5, 1921 (aged 76); Antioch, California
- Burial place: San Francisco National Cemetery
- Other name: James Rankin-Nagel
- Occupations: Lighthouse Keeper, Boatswain
- Spouse: Nellie
- Children: Arthur and Edna Neva

James Rankin (February 20, 1844 – January 5, 1921) was a lighthouse keeper in the United States.

A native of Killashee, County Longford, Ireland, Rankin emigrated to the United States in 1867. He served in the U.S. Lighthouse Service as the keeper of East Brother Island Light in California from 1877 to 1878. He then transferred to Fort Point Light in San Francisco, where he remained for 40 years, until retiring in 1919. During his tenure he was credited with saving the lives of 18 people.

Rankin died in Antioch, California, where he had moved soon after retiring.

In 1997, the United States Coast Guard named a 175 ft buoy tender USCGC James Rankin (WLM-555) in his honor. Its homeport is Curtis Bay, Baltimore.
