= Arthur Rankin (footballer) =

Scottish footballer

Personal information
- Full name: Arthur Rankin
- Date of birth: 30 April 1904
- Place of birth: Glasgow, Scotland
- Date of death: 1962 (aged 57–58)
- Position: Winger

Senior career*
Years	Team	Apps	(Gls)
1919–1920	Rutherglen Glencairn		
1920–1922	Clyde		
1922–1926	Dykehead		
1926–1929	Bristol City	70	(12)
1929–1930	Charlton Athletic	0	(0)
1930	Yeovil & Petters United		
Total		70	(12)
- * Club domestic league appearances and goals

Arthur Rankin (30 April 1904 – 1962) was a Scottish footballer who played in the Football League for Bristol City.
