= Rankine =

Rankine is a surname and occasional first name, related to Rankin. The male given name "Rankin" was a diminutive form of the given name "Rand(e)" found in medieval Scotland and England, with the hypocoristic suffix "-kin" attached. The name is related to Randolph and other names.

"Rankine" as a given name may be derived from Ragnar, an Old Norse name meaning "warrior" or counsel, which travelled south with the Vikings, transitioning to its present form there during medieval times.

== People with the surname ==
Notable people with the surname include:

- W. J. M. Rankine (1820–1872), Scottish engineer and physicist
  - Rankine body an elliptical shape of significance in fluid dynamics, named for Rankine
  - Rankine scale, an absolute-temperature scale related to the Fahrenheit scale, named for Rankine
  - Rankine cycle, a thermodynamic heat-engine cycle, also named after Rankine
  - Rankine Lecture, a lecture delivered annually by an expert in the field of geotechnics
- Alan Rankine (born 1958), Scottish rock musician
- Alexander Rankine (1881–1956), British physicist
- Andy Rankine (1895–1965), Scottish footballer
- Camille Rankine, American poet
- Claudia Rankine (born 1963), American poet and playwright
- Daniel Rankine, Australian musician, stage name Trials
- Dean Rankine, Australian comics artist
- George Rankine Irwin, (1907–1998) American materials scientist
- James Rankine (1828–1897), South Australian politician
- Jennifer Rankine (born 1953), South Australian politician
- John Rankine (1918–2013), British science fiction author
- John Rankine (Australian politician) (1801–1864), South Australian physician and politician
- John Rankine (governor) (1907–1987), British colonial administrator
- Leila Rankine (1932–1993), Aboriginal Australian poet
- Mark Rankine (born 1969), English footballer
- Michael Rankine (born 1985), English footballer
- Scotty Rankine (1909–1995), Canadian Olympic athlete
- Thomas Rankine (born 1978), American musician
- William Rankine Milligan, Lord Milligan (1898–1975), Scottish judge and politician
