= Ian Rankin (footballer) =

Scottish footballer

Personal information
- Date of birth: 5 September 1979 (age 47)
- Place of birth: Bellshill, Scotland
- Position: Striker

Senior career*
Years	Team	Apps	(Gls)
1996–1999	Airdrieonians	1	(0)
2000–2002	Albion Rovers	17	(0)

Managerial career
- 2008–2010: Newmains United
- 2010–2011: Blantyre Victoria
- 2011–2013: Newmains United
- 2018: Forth Wanderers FC
- * Club domestic league appearances and goals

Ian Rankin (born 5 September 1979 in Bellshill, Scotland) is a former professional and semi-professional footballer and former manager of Blantyre Victoria and Newmains United in the Scottish Junior Football Association Central District First Division and Second Division.

On 24 June 2010, Rankin left Newmains United to become the new manager of Blantyre Victoria after Willie Harvey resigned to take over at Rutherglen Glencairn.

On 28 October 2011, Rankin rejoined Newmains United as manager till October 2013.
