= Fort Point National Historic Site =

Fort in San Francisco, California

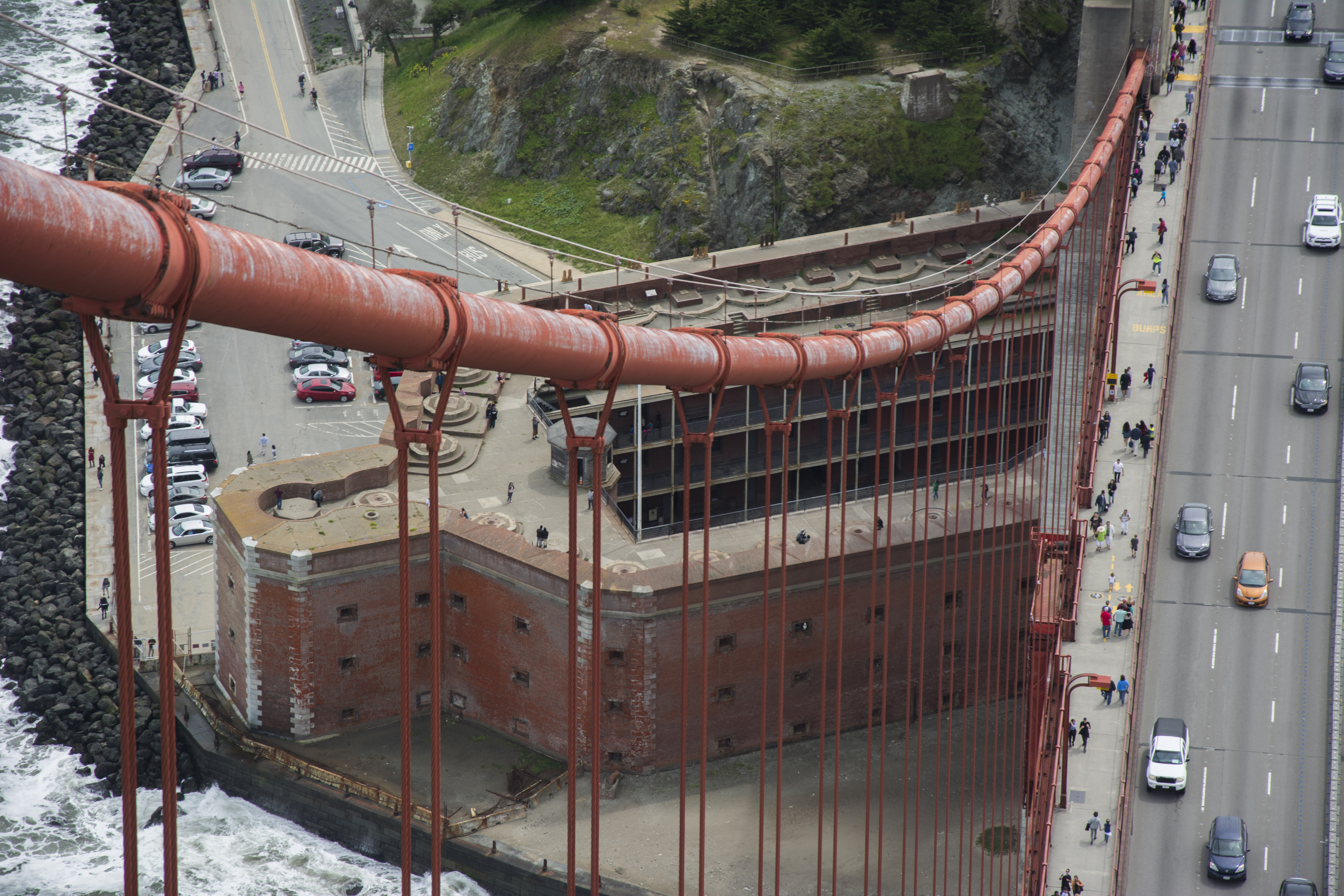
- Fort Point beneath the Golden Gate Bridge

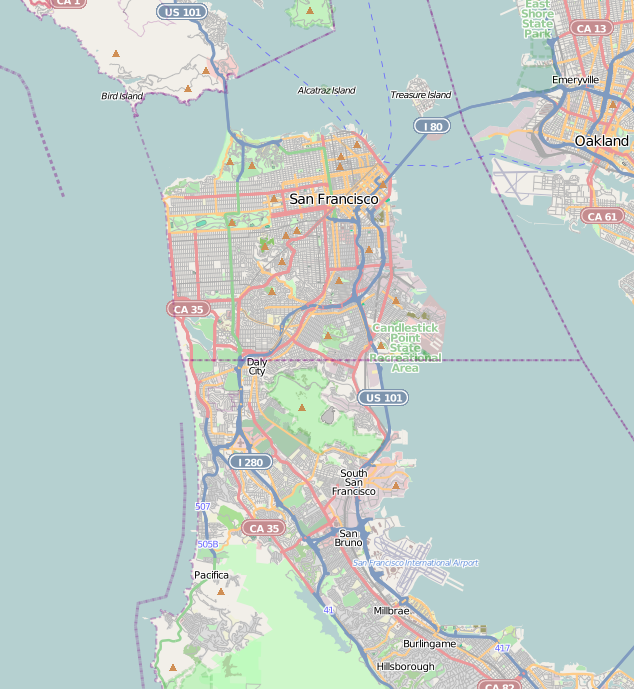
- Location within San Francisco Location within San Francisco Bay Area Location within California Location within the United States
- Nearest city: San Francisco, California, U.S.
- Coordinates: 37°48′38″N 122°28′38″W
- Area: 29 acres (12 ha)
- Established: 16 October 1970
- Visitors: 1,010,870 (in 2025)
- Governing body: National Park Service
- Website: Fort Point National Historic Site
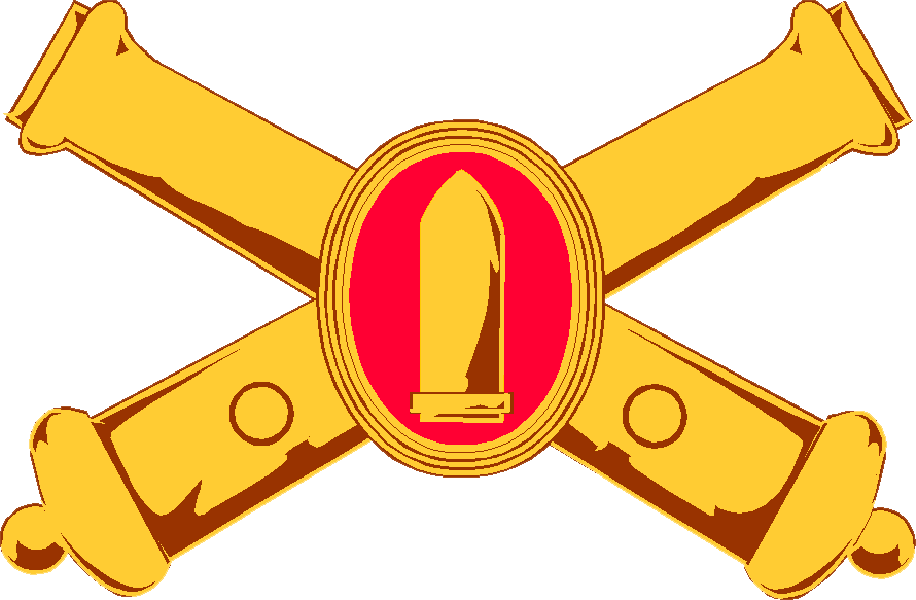
- Fort Point
- Fort Winfield Scott
- Near San Francisco, California in United States

Site information
- Type: Harbor defense installation
- Owner: United States Army
- Controlled by: 6th Air Defense Artillery Regiment

Site history
- Built: 1861
- Fate: Decommission 1970

California Historical Landmark
- Official name: Castillo De San Joaquín
- Reference no.: 82

U.S. National Register of Historic Places
- Designated: 10/16/1970
- Reference no.: 70000146

Fort Point, known historically as the Castillo de San Joaquín (Spanish for "Saint Joachim's Castle") is a masonry seacoast fortification located on the southern side of the Golden Gate at the entrance to San Francisco Bay. It is also the geographic name of the promontory upon which the fort and the southern approach of the Golden Gate Bridge were constructed.

The site was originally fortified by the Spanish in 1794 as a complementary defense outpost to the Presidio of San Francisco. The current structure was completed by the United States Army after the U.S. conquest of California and just before the American Civil War, to defend San Francisco Bay against hostile warships. The fort is now protected as Fort Point National Historic Site, a United States National Historic Site administered by the National Park Service as a unit of the Golden Gate National Recreation Area. It is now popular as a tourist viewing point of the Golden Gate Bridge directly on top of it.

== History ==
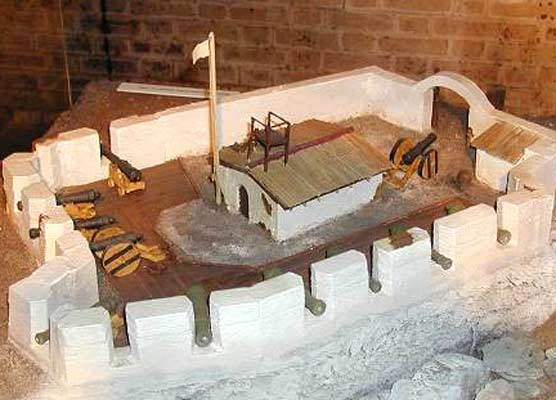
Model of the Castillo de San Joaquín, built by the Spanish in 1794.

In 1769 Spain occupied the San Francisco area and by 1776 had established the area's first European settlement, with a mission and a presidio. To protect against encroachment by the British and Russians, Spain selected Punta del Cantil Blanco, a promontory with a high white cliff (cantil blanco) located at the narrowest part of the bay's entrance, to construct a fortification. The Castillo de San Joaquín was constructed in 1794, subordinate to the nearby Presidio de San Francisco. It was an adobe structure housing nine to thirteen cannons.

Mexico won independence from Spain in 1821, gaining control of the region and the fort, but in 1835 the Mexican army moved to Sonoma leaving the castillo's adobe walls to crumble in the wind and rain. On July 1, 1846, after the Mexican–American War broke out between Mexico and the United States, U.S. forces, including Captain John Charles Fremont, Kit Carson and a band of 10 followers, captured and occupied the empty castillo and spiked (disabled) the cannons.

Sometime during the Spanish and Mexican eras, the Punta del Cantil Blanco came to be known as the "Punta del Castillo" ("Castle Point"), which was carried over into the era of U.S. sovereignty, in rough translation, as "Fort Point".

=== U.S. era ===
Following the United States' victory in 1848, California was annexed by the U.S. and became a state in 1850. The gold rush of 1849 had caused rapid settlement of the area, which was recognized as commercially and strategically valuable to the United States. Military officials soon recommended a series of fortifications to secure San Francisco Bay. Coastal defenses were built at Alcatraz Island, Fort Mason, and Fort Point.

The U.S. Army Corps of Engineers began work on Fort Point in 1853. Plans specified that the lowest tier of artillery be as close as possible to water level so cannonballs could ricochet across the water's surface to hit enemy ships at the water-line. Workers blasted the 90-foot (27 m) cliff down to 15 feet (4.6 m) above sea level. The structure featured seven-foot-thick walls and multi-tiered casemated construction typical of Third System forts. It was sited to defend the maximum amount of harbor area. While there were more than 30 such forts on the East Coast, Fort Point was the only one on the West Coast. In 1854 Inspector General Joseph K. Mansfield declared "this point as the key to the whole Pacific Coast...and it should receive untiring exertions".

A crew of 200, many unemployed miners, labored for eight years on the fort. In 1861, with war looming, the army mounted the fort's first cannon. Colonel Albert Sidney Johnston, commander of the Department of the Pacific, prepared Bay Area defenses and ordered in the first troops to the fort. Kentucky-born Johnston then resigned his commission to join the Confederate Army; he was killed at the Battle of Shiloh in 1862.

=== Fort Point and the Civil War ===
Throughout the Civil War, artillerymen at Fort Point stood guard for an enemy that never came. The Confederate raider CSS Shenandoah planned to attack San Francisco, but on the way to the harbor the captain learned that the war was over; it was August 1865, months after General Lee surrendered.

Severe damage to similar forts on the Atlantic Coast during the war – Fort Sumter in South Carolina and Fort Pulaski in Georgia – challenged the effectiveness of masonry walls against rifled artillery. Troops soon moved out of Fort Point, and it was never again continuously occupied by the army. The fort was nonetheless important enough to receive protection from the elements. In 1869 a granite seawall was completed. The following year, some of the fort's cannon were moved to Battery East on the bluffs nearby, where they were more protected. In 1882 Fort Point was officially named Fort Winfield Scott after the hero of the war against Mexico. In 1886, it reverted to its original Fort Point name with the establishment of a new fort within the Presidio of San Francisco that was then named Fort Winfield Scott.

=== Into a new century ===
In 1892, the army began constructing the new Endicott System concrete fortifications armed with steel, breech-loading rifled guns. Within eight years, all 103 of the smooth-bore cannons at Fort Point had been dismounted and sold for scrap. The fort, moderately damaged in the 1906 earthquake, where the fort was used as a temporary refugee camp by the U.S. Army, was used over the next four decades for barracks, training, and storage, however, in 1913, part of the interior wall was removed by the army in their short-lived attempt to make the fort the army detention barracks using soldier and prisoner labor. The detention barracks were later built on Alcatraz Island and was used until becoming a federal prison. Soldiers from the 6th U.S. Coast Artillery were stationed there during World War II to guard minefields and the anti-submarine net that spanned the Golden Gate.

New quarters and administrative buildings were constructed on the higher ground, behind the new Endicott batteries, moving Fort Scott to this location.

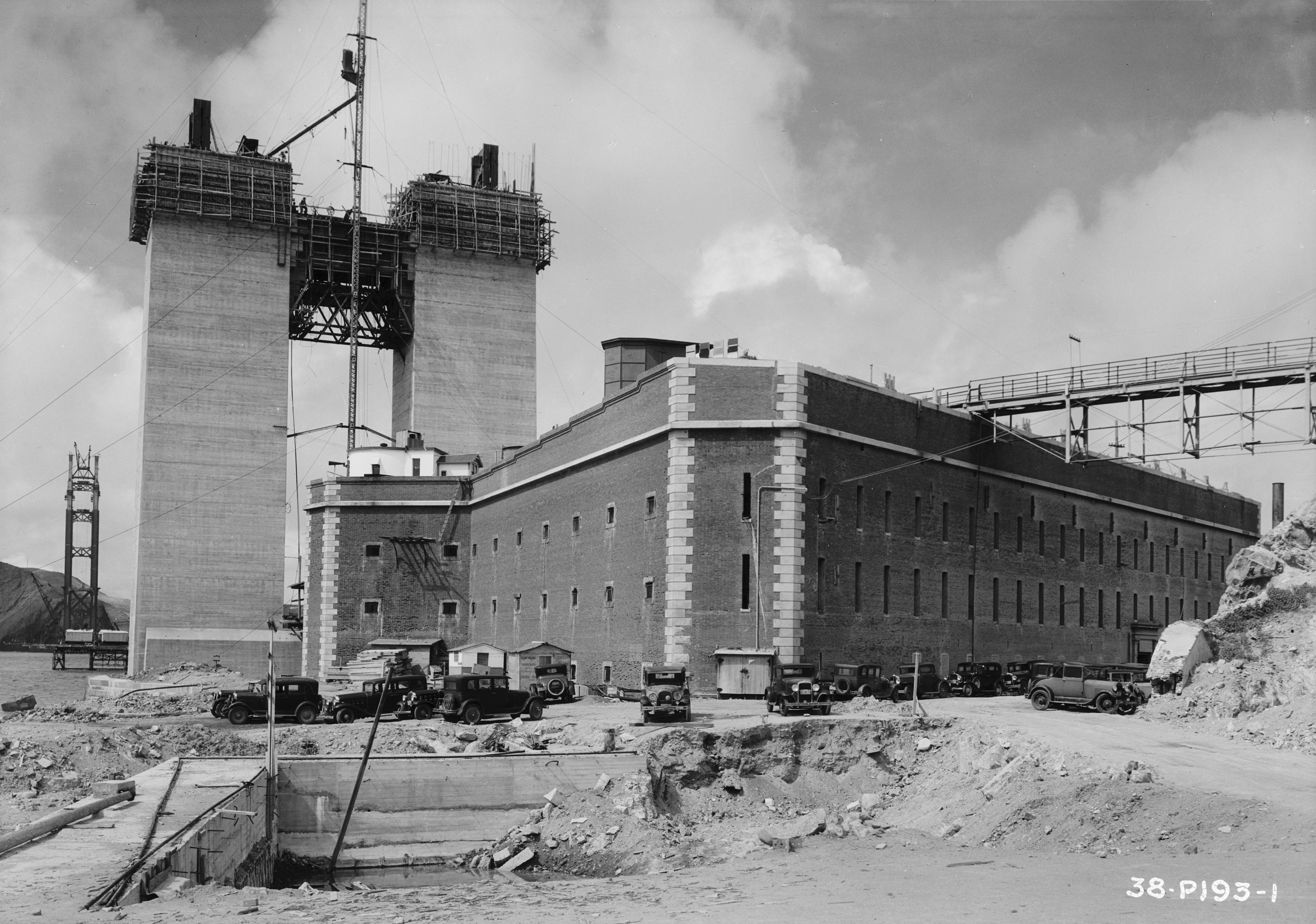
Fort Point in 1934, with the Golden Gate Bridge under construction

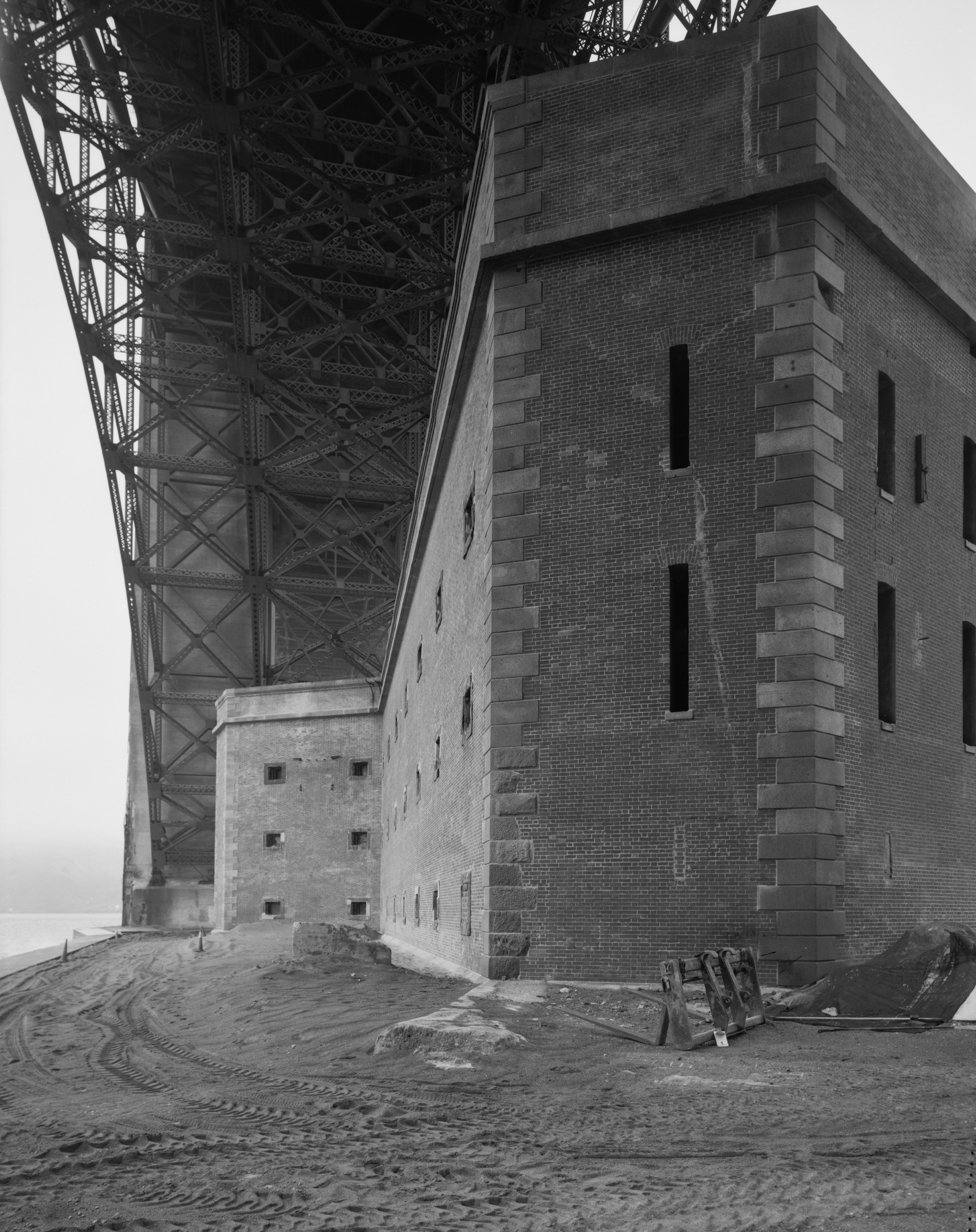
View from under bridge

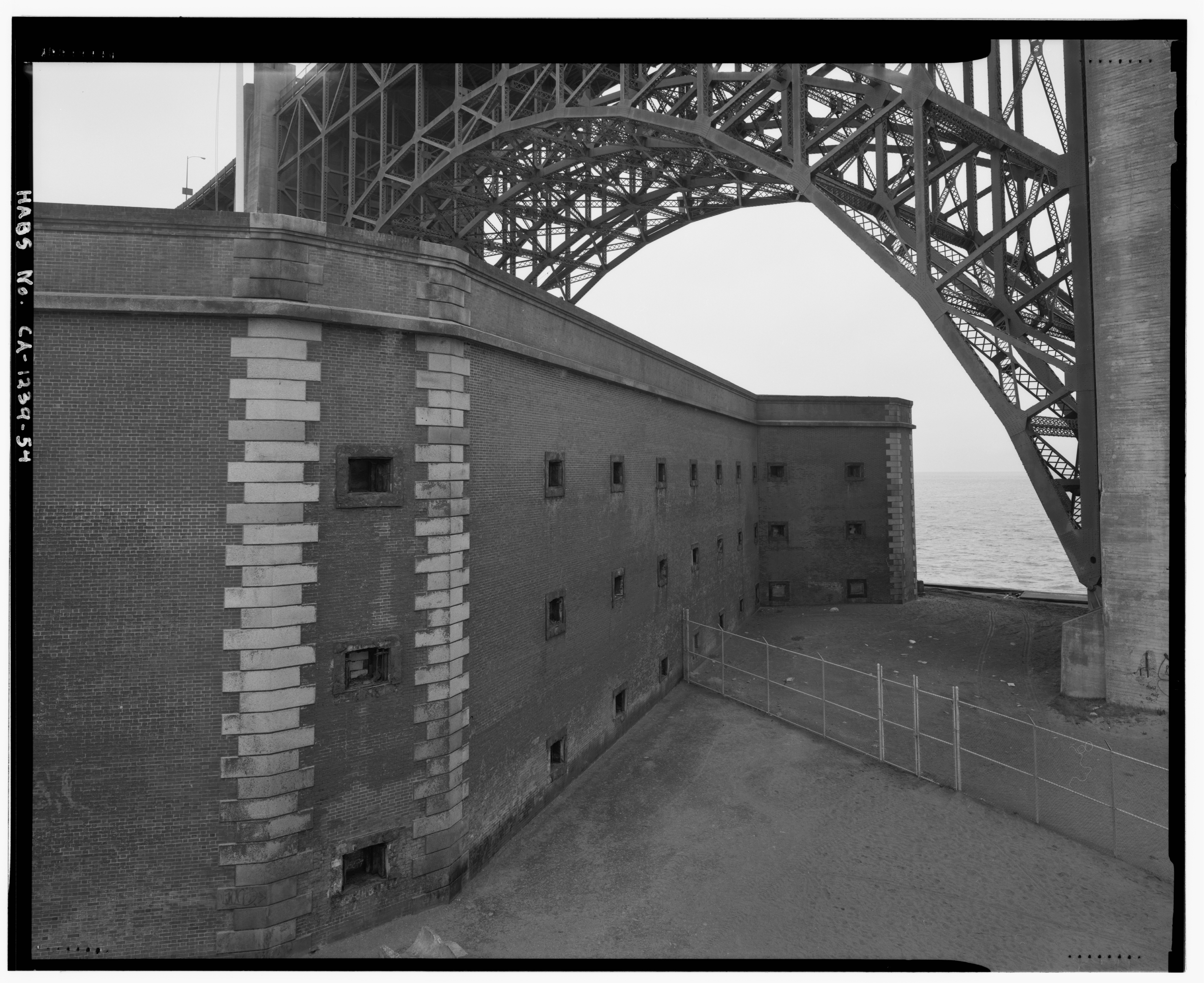
A general view of the northwest wall, in relation to the Fort Point arch of the Golden Gate Bridge

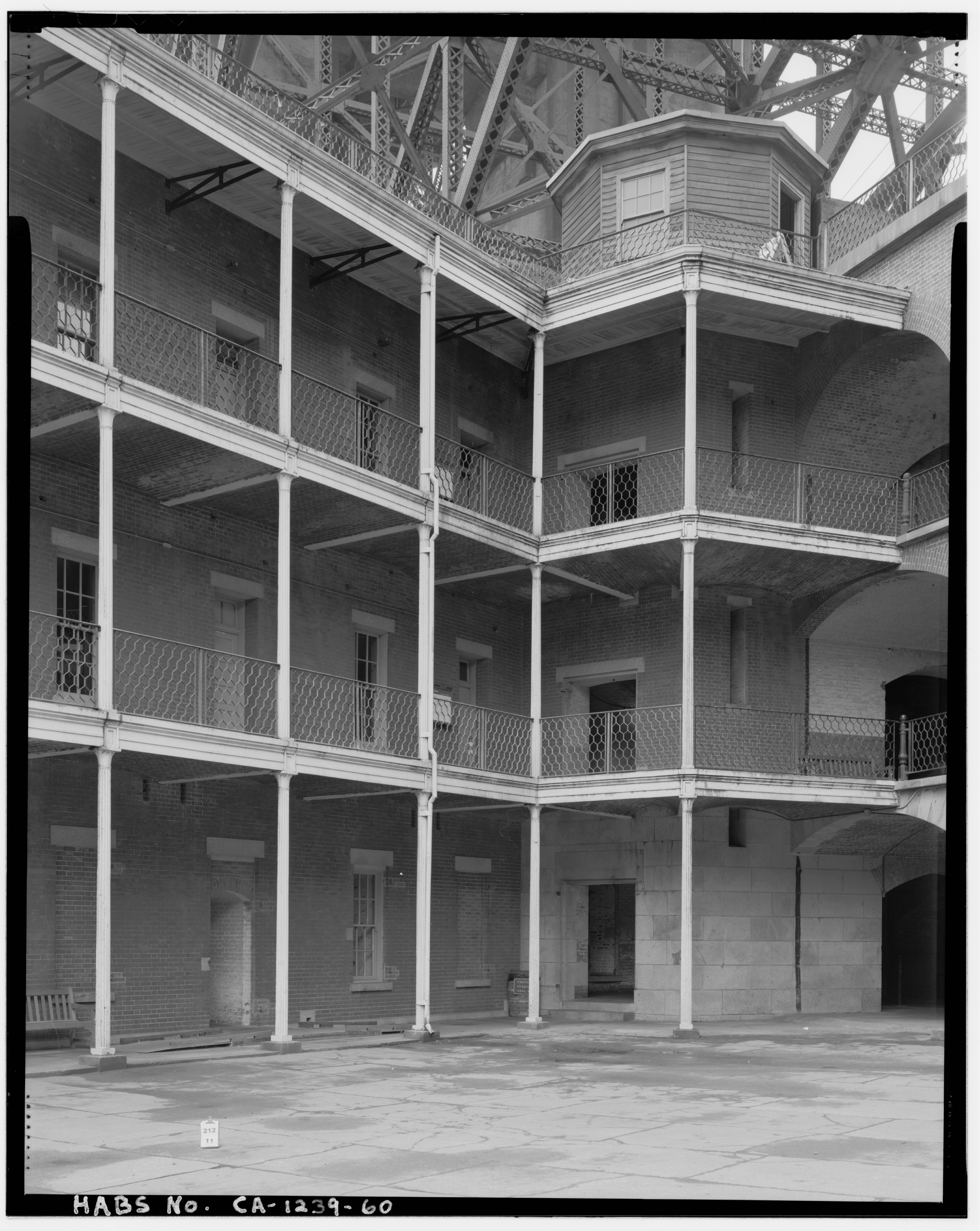
A view toward the southwest corner of the interior, showing the octagonal wooden structure atop the southwest circular staircase

=== Preserving Fort Point ===
In 1926 the American Institute of Architects proposed preserving the fort for its outstanding military architecture. Funds were unavailable, and the ideas languished. Plans for the Golden Gate Bridge in the 1930s called for the fort's removal, but Chief Engineer Joseph Strauss redesigned the bridge to save the fort. "While the old fort has no military value now," Strauss said, "it remains nevertheless a fine example of the mason's art.... It should be preserved and restored as a national monument." The fort is situated directly below the southern approach to the bridge, underneath an arch that supports the roadway.

Preservation efforts were revived after World War II. On October 16, 1970, President Richard Nixon signed a bill creating Fort Point National Historic Site.

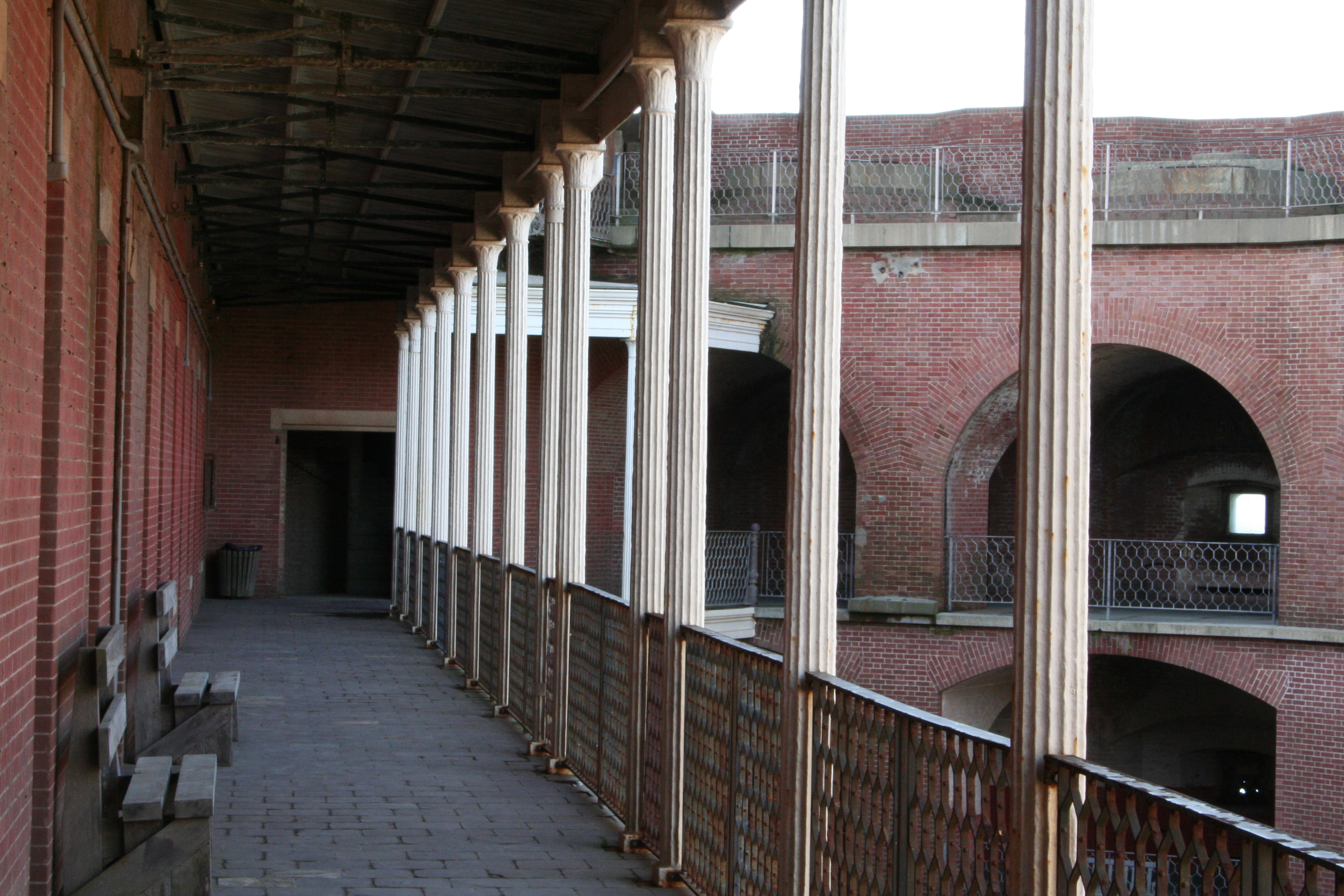
Middle level of Fort Point

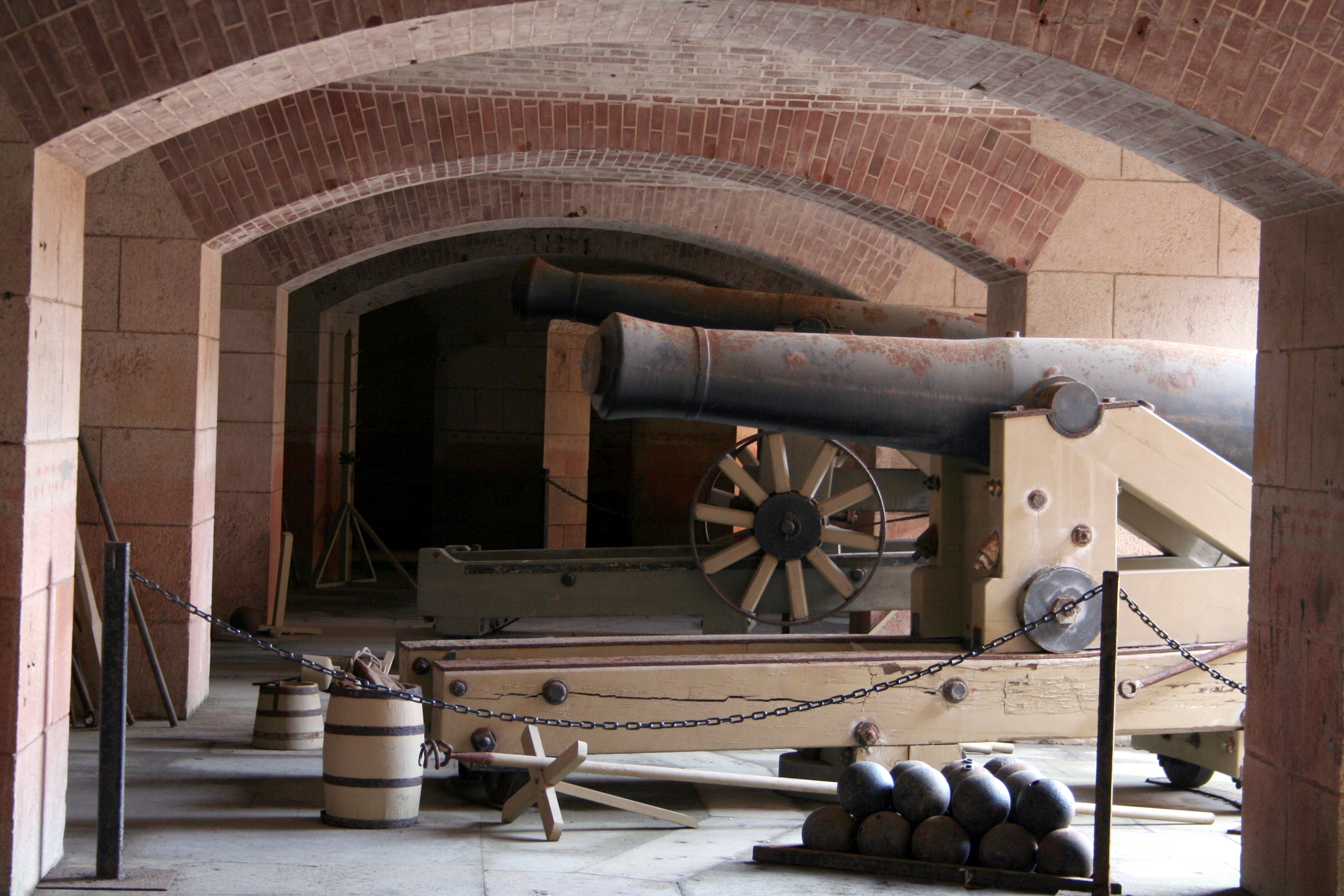
Cannons on display at Fort Point

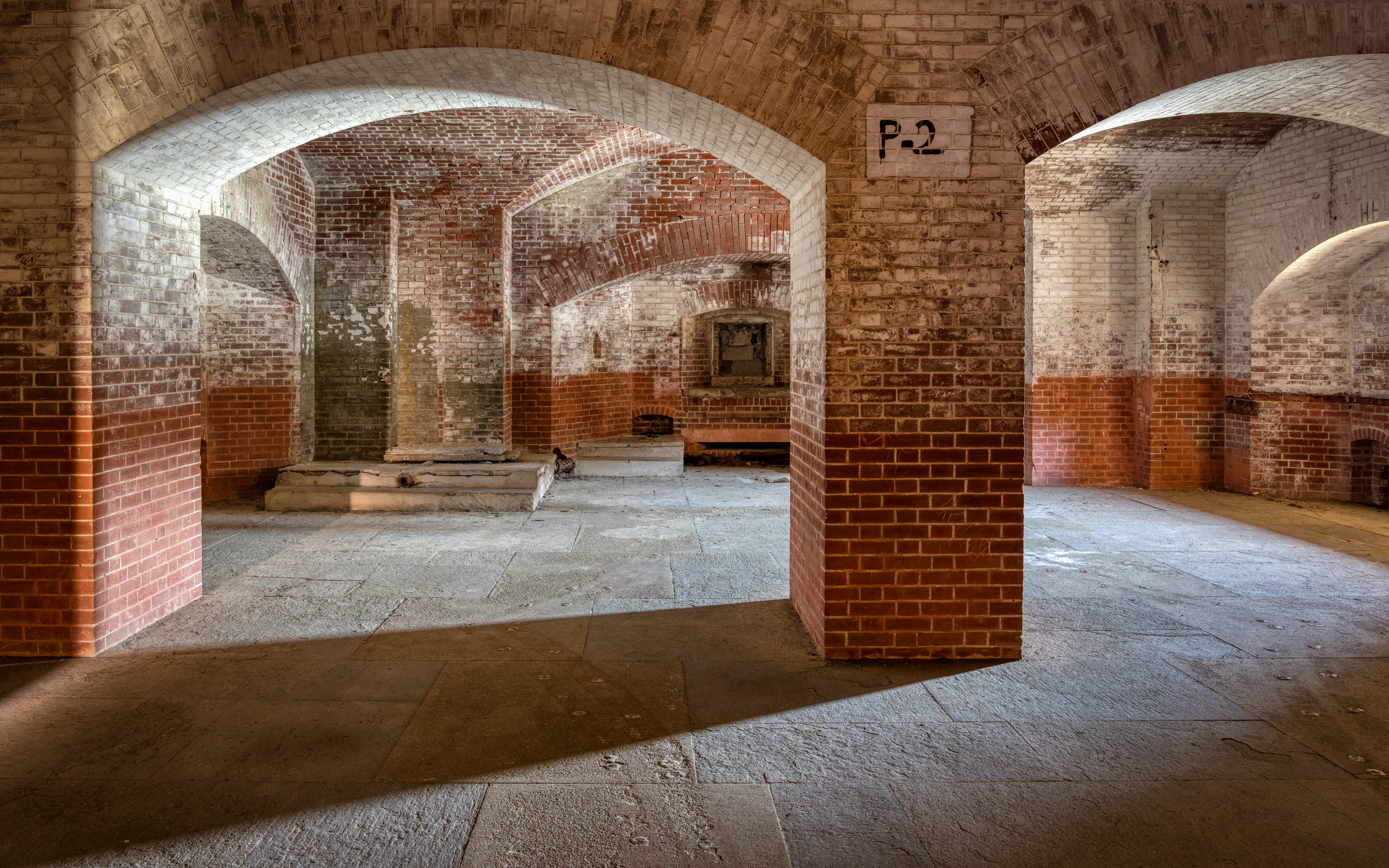
Interior of Fort Point

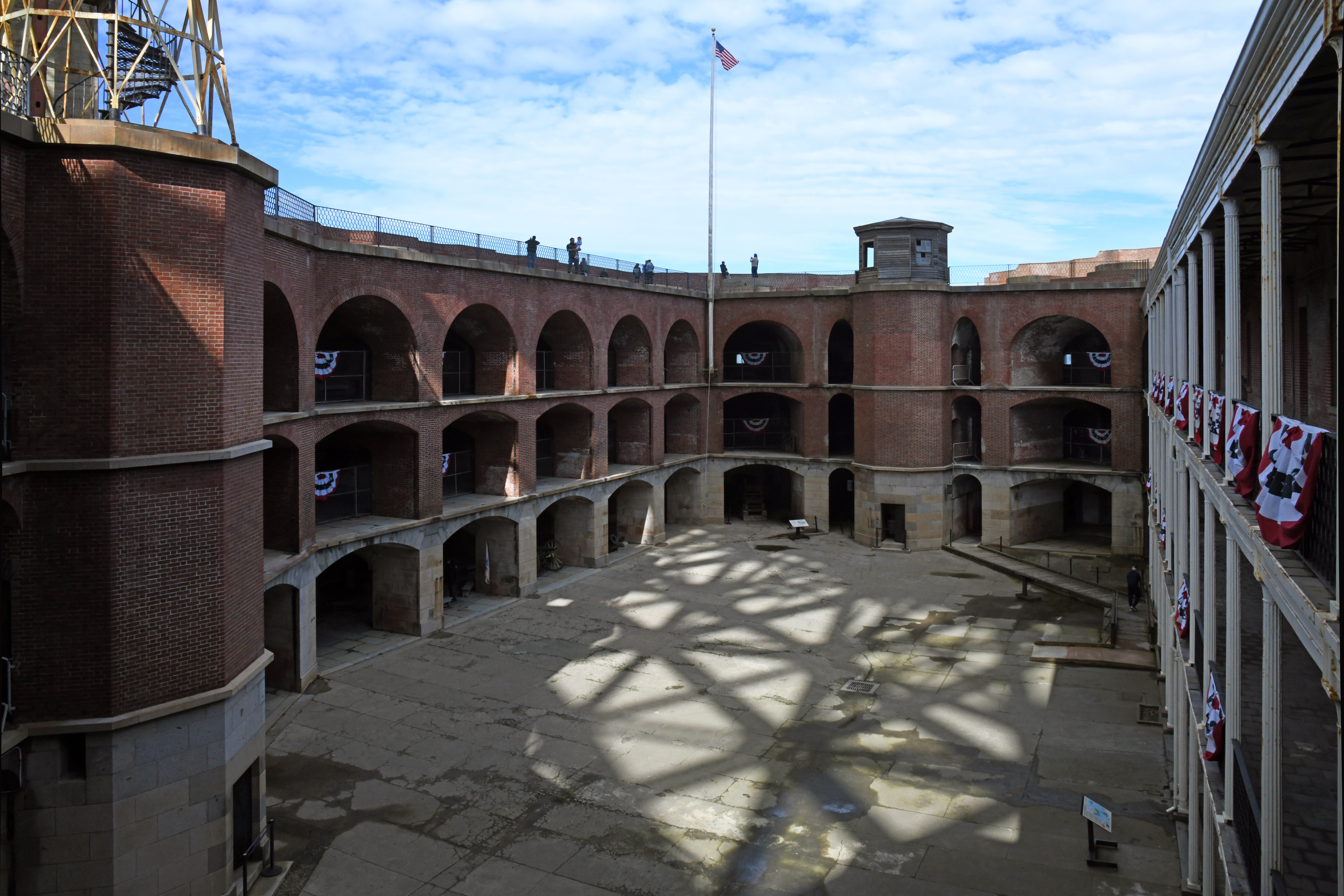
The courtyard of the fort

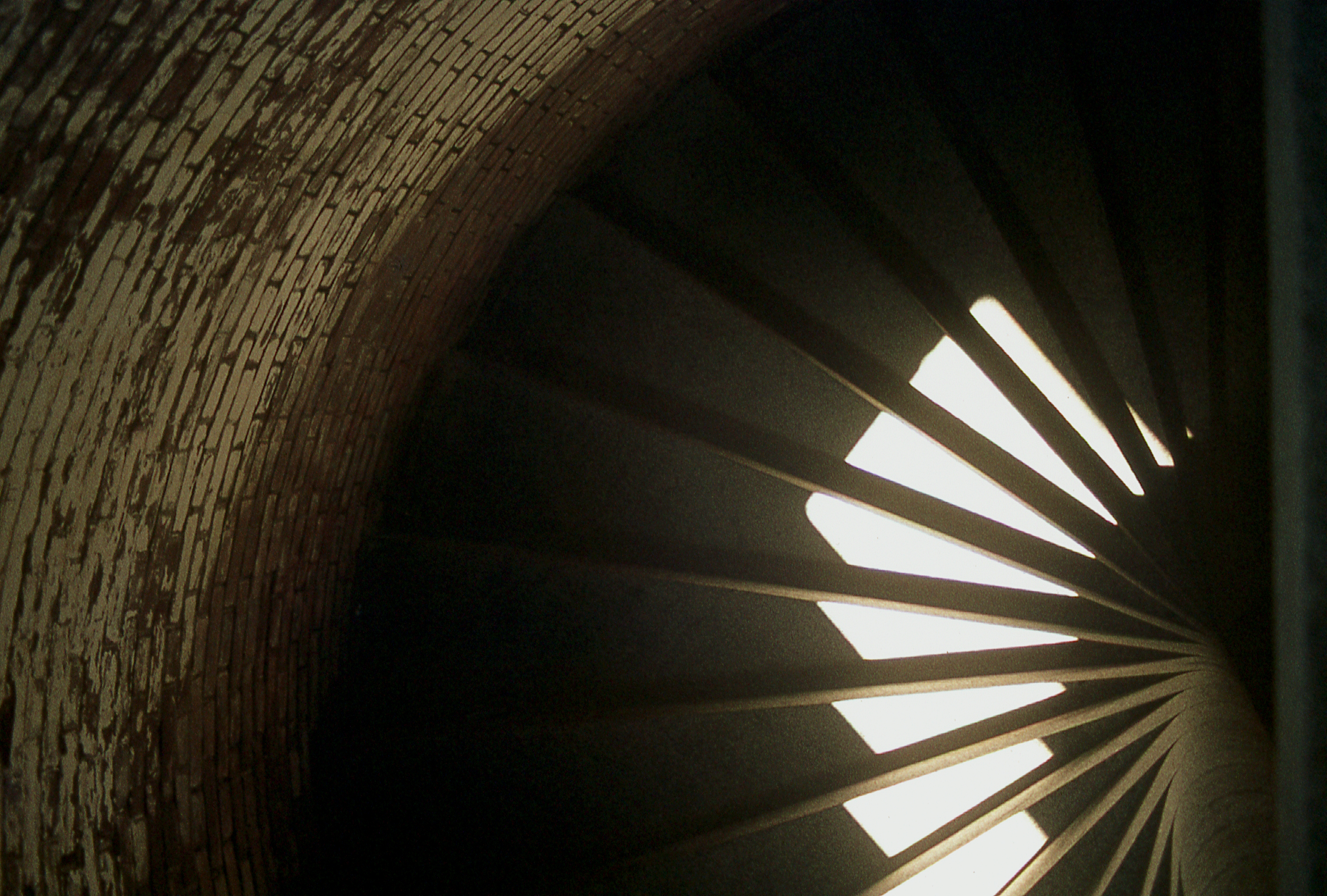
Circular stairway at Fort Point. Photographed about 1975.

=== Landmark status ===
Fort Point is designated as California Historical Landmark #82, officially listed under the site's original name, Castillo de San Joaquín.

=== Recreation ===
The rocky point north of the fort produces waves, in the winter months, that are popular with surfers.

== Media use ==
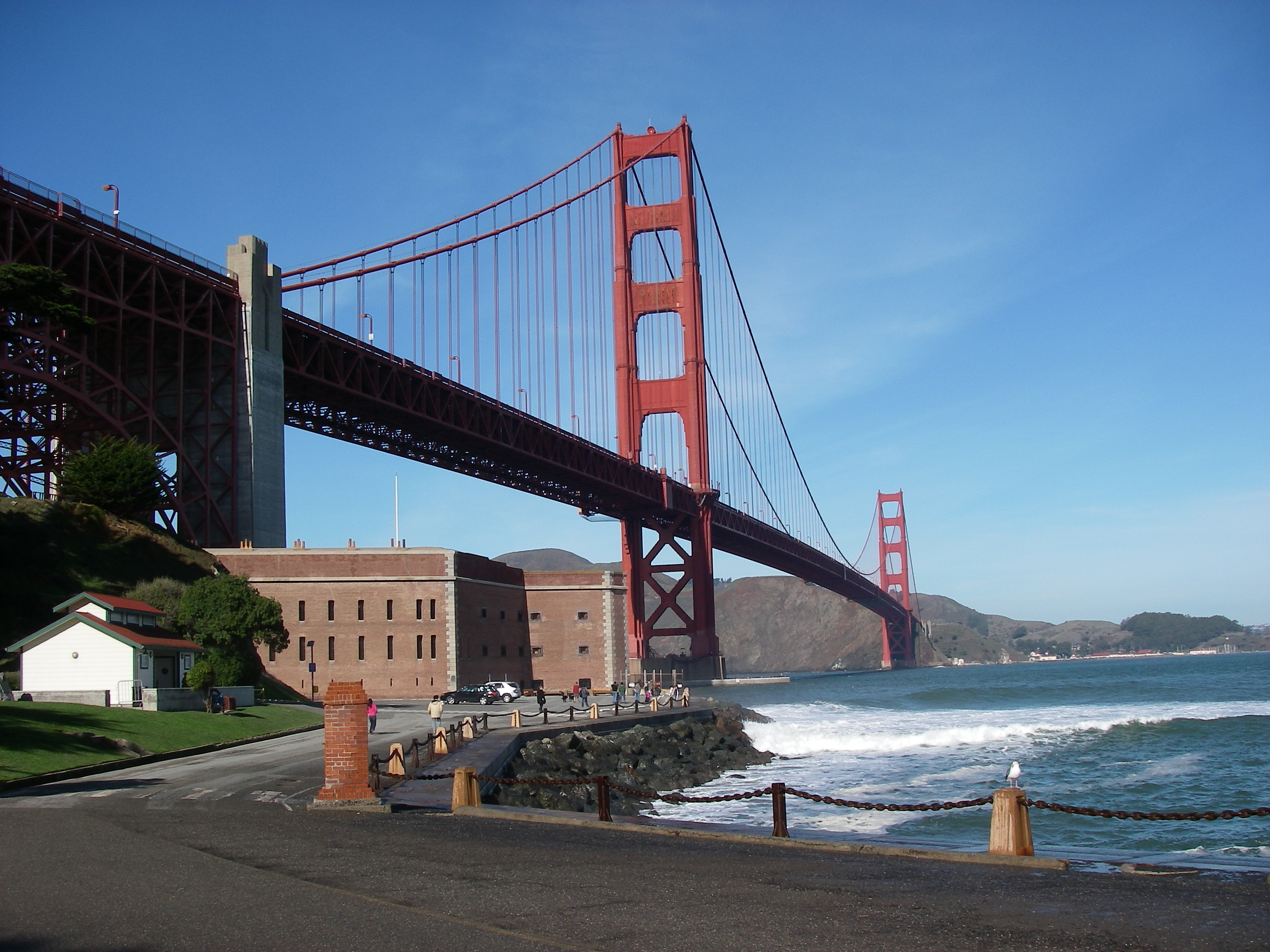
Approach to the fort

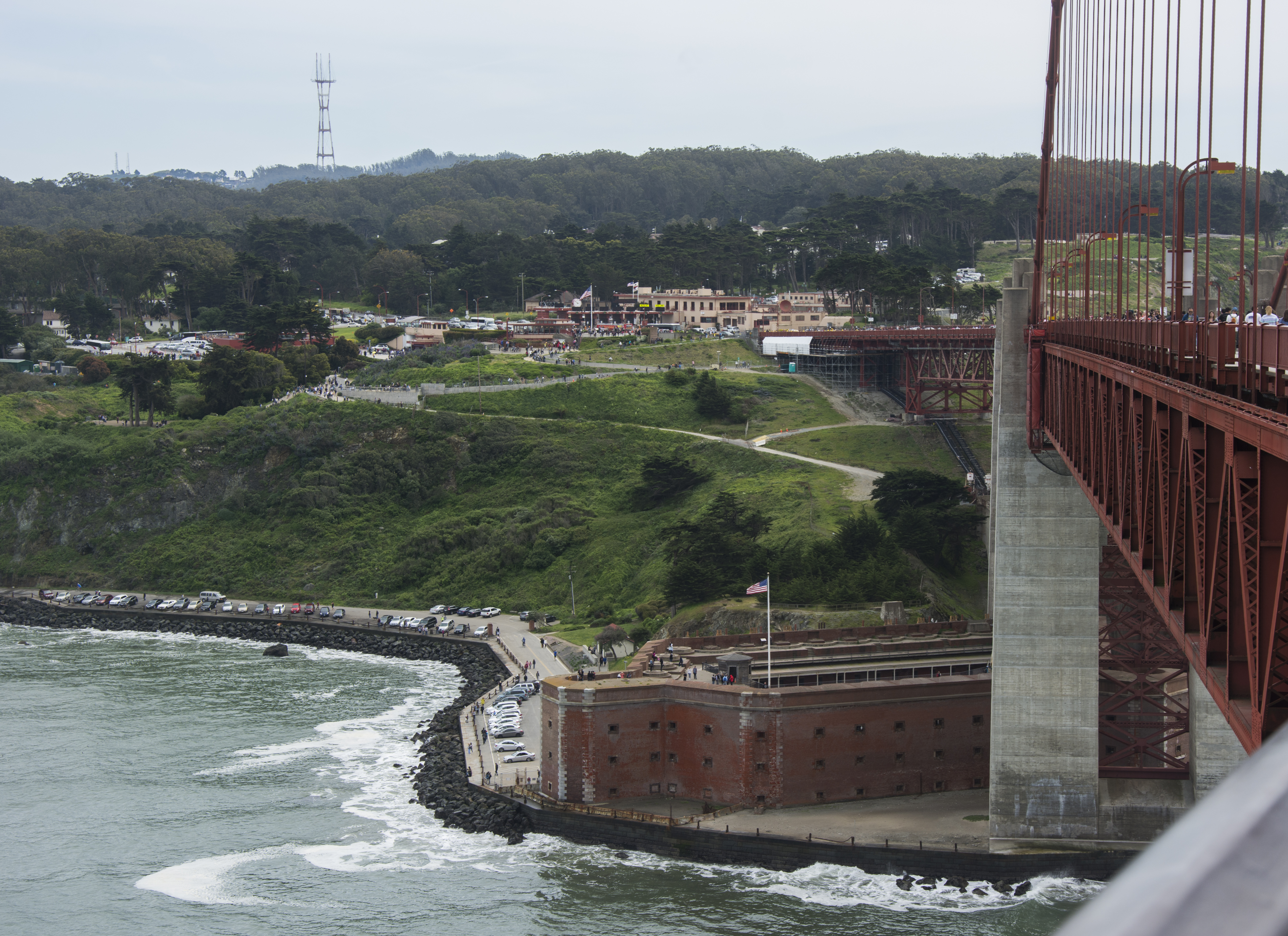
The fort from the Golden Gate Bridge deck

Fort Point is a popular filming location. It is also mentioned in other media.

=== In film ===
- In Dark Passage (1947), a fight scene with Humphrey Bogart on the bluff above the fort ends with his opponent falling to his death in what is now the fort's parking lot.
- In the 1950 film The Man Who Cheated Himself, there is a five-minute search scene near the end that was filmed at Fort Point and shows many shots of the fort.
- In Alfred Hitchcock's 1958 thriller Vertigo, Kim Novak's character jumps here into San Francisco Bay in a suicide attempt.
- In Point Blank, the 1967 John Boorman noir movie starring Lee Marvin and Angie Dickinson, it is shown as the location for the "Alcatraz Drop" at the closed Alcatraz Island prison. However, in the final scene a continuous camera shot rises to show Alcatraz in the distance, revealing this to be Fort Point.
- In Richard Lester's 1968 film Petulia, George C. Scott's character plays with his boys, ignoring 'No Trespassing' signs, at Fort Point.
- In the 1969 pilot film for the TV series Then Came Bronson, Martin Sheen's character jumps to his death from Fort Point.
- The phone booth scene in the 1977 Mel Brooks comedy High Anxiety took place beneath the Golden Gate Bridge at Fort Point, where the crucial water rescue scene takes place in Vertigo, part of the film's thematic homage to Alfred Hitchcock.
- In the 1985 James Bond film A View To a Kill the fort can be seen in various aerial shots, particularly the final scene which takes place above the Golden Gate Bridge.
- The 1999 film Bicentennial Man, starring Robin Williams, has a scene featuring Fort Point as a bustling market, with the main building being home to NDR Robotics.
- In the 2014 film Dawn of the Planet of the Apes the humans use Fort Point's armory to dramatically increase their firepower in the form of armored vehicles and large amounts of munitions.
- The 2019 film The Last Black Man in San Francisco filmed throughout San Francisco, with several scenes filmed outside and around the fort.
- The fort is briefly shown on a television during the opening of the 2019 horror film Us.

=== In games ===
- A building based on Fort Point is included in the 2004 video game Grand Theft Auto: San Andreas as a night club called Jizzy's Pleasure Domes in the fictional city San Fierro heavily based on San Francisco.
- Fort Point is also included in the video game NBA Street
- Fort Point is included in the game Midtown Madness 2
- Fort Point is one of the surf spots in Transworld Surf.
- Fort Point is a mission location in Watch Dogs 2.
- Fort Point (along with the Golden Gate Bridge) has been faithfully recreated in Duke Nukem 3D 20th Anniversary World Tour's episode 5, level 6, named Golden Carnage.

=== In television ===
- In The Amazing Race 16, teams are here presented with a building's height, year built, and features. They must figure out that it's Coit Tower and go there to find their next clue.
- In Season 3, Episode 20 of the series The West Wing (titled "The Black Vera Wang"), Fort Point is the intended target of a foiled terrorist attack by Islamic fundamentalists, who are planning to attack the fort because of its proximity to the Golden Gate Bridge. The attack is allegedly funded by the fictitious Arab nation of Qumar, a recurring source of terrorism over the course of the series.
- The fort was featured in an episode of Emergency! as a rescue takes place above the fort on the girders below the Golden Gate Bridge.
- Fort Point was in a made-for-TV movie, What's a Nice Girl Like You Doing, a spinoff of Emergency! The movie opens with a tour guide talking about the fort to a group of school-age kids. A worker falls from the Golden Gate Bridge and is hanging by his safety rope.
- The Streets of San Francisco, a crime drama series produced by Quinn Martin Productions (1972–77), starring Karl Malden and Michael Douglas, filmed a shootout scene in Fort Point. Malden killed a "bad guy."
- In the Murder, She Wrote episode "Birds of a Feather," the opening credits are at Fort Point.
- In the Nash Bridges episode "Skirt Chasers", there is a gunfight with a heroin dealer and thugs at Fort Point.

=== In music ===
- The cover image of Editors' album The Back Room is of Fort Point.

=== In books ===
- The 1980 John Varley science fiction novel Wizard begins at Fort Point, which in the book contains an embassy.

=== In theater ===
- We Players, a site-specific theater company, performed a production of William Shakespeare's Macbeth at Fort Point in 2008. This production was revived in 2013, 2014, and 2025.

== See also ==
- Fort Point Lighthouse
- 49-Mile Scenic Drive
- 63rd Coast Artillery (United States)
- Alcatraz Island
- Presidio of San Francisco
