= Lou Rankin =

American sculptor

Lou Rankin (May 27, 1929 – August 12, 2016) was an American sculptor starting in the 1960s. He developed an innovative use of concrete to create sculptures of animals, all with a touch of whimsy. Whether joyful, mischievous or a touch of pathos, all of his creations are seemingly alive.

Originally training to be a cartoonist, Lou Rankin was attending the University of California, Berkeley, before being sent to the Korean War. When he returned from his tour of duty, Rankin attended UCLA, where he took various art and writing classes. One of them was a sculpture class, which inspired him to make Christmas gifts of birds made from nails. These were so popular that Rankin realized he had found a way to make a living from art. His bird sculpture was used to decorate the lobby during the premiere of Alfred Hitchcock's classic thriller The Birds in New York in 1963. In 1964, Rankin tried using concrete for the first time in order to make the body of an owl, which he could not do with nails. These were sold in art galleries, at Gump's in San Francisco, and at his own gallery in the Tlaquepaque complex in Sedona, Arizona. In the 1990s, Rankin developed a serious allergy to concrete, forcing him to wear latex gloves when handling the medium. Rankin's sculpture has been presented as a U.S. presidential gift of protocol. In the 1990s, Rankin started designing toys and gifts for Dakin and Hallmark Cards, both well-known American companies.
