= Senator Rankin =

Senator Rankin may refer to:

- Bob Rankin (fl. 2010s), Colorado State Senate
- Francis H. Rankin Sr. (1818–1900), Michigan State Senate
- John Walker Rankin (1823–1869), Iowa State Senate
- Joseph Rankin (1833–1886), Wisconsin State Senate
- Luke A. Rankin (born 1962), South Carolina Senate
