= Aquatic invasive species regulations in Michigan =

The state of Michigan defines an aquatic invasive species as "an aquatic species that is nonnative to the ecosystem under consideration and whose introduction causes or is likely to cause economic or environmental harm or harm to human health". There are approximately 160 invasive aquatic species residing in Michigan. Some of the most commonly known species are the Zebra Mussel, Quagga Mussel, Sea Lamprey, and several species of Asian Carp. Michigan's Natural Resources and Environmental Protection Act (NREPA) is the primary state law regulating aquatic invasive species in Michigan.

== Background ==
Aquatic invasive species were first introduced to the Great Lakes in the early 1800s through ballast tank water. Freight ships carrying goods from foreign countries would travel through the Great Lakes and release their ballast water into the lakes. Legal action between the Natural Resource Defense Council (NRDC), and the EPA have challenged the EPA standards for ballast water claiming they are insufficient. The suit is about lowering the limit to zero invasive species per ballast discharge. These standards are continually a challenge to enforce upon ships. Ballast water tanks transport an estimated 7,000 aquatic organisms per day. Invasive aquatic species such as the zebra mussel and sea lamprey have caused environmental and economical destruction of the Great Lakes region for decades. These species are introduced in various ways. Sea Lamprey are thought to have entered through ballast water as previously mentioned, however zebra mussels originally entered by attaching to the hulls of international shipping vessels. Invasive aquatic species in the Great Lakes area cause upwards of $200 million annually in prevention strategies and loss revenue. The first federal invasive aquatic species law in the United States was the Nonindigenous Aquatic Nuisance Prevention and Control Act of 1990. It formed the Aquatic Nuisance Species Task Force, whose primary job was to develop a program of prevention, monitoring, control, and study of aquatic invasive species in the United States. The act was amended in 1996 by the National Invasive Species Act.

== History ==
Outside of U.S. federal invasive aquatic species laws, Michigan has some of its own to protect Michigan waters and the Great Lakes. Michigan has a 3,224 mile-long shoreline along the Great Lakes, making it very economically and ecologically dependent and protective of the lakes and the aquatic species that live in it. The entire Great Lakes shoreline is shared with Canada and other US states making laws surrounding invasive species a multi party effort that requires collaboration.

== Economic effects ==
The invasive species in Michigan have significant effects on both the ecology and the economy In the state. The sport and commercial fishing industry generates over 3.4 Billion dollars a year in the Great Lakes, and employs over 10,000 individuals. Sea lamprey have put a dent into these values as they have decreased the fishing yield. This damage is not limited to just the fish though. The power industry has taken a financial hit from the AIS as well. Power plants adjacent to the Great Lakes use millions of gallons of water for cooling, and in recent years they have had to clean out their water systems due to the abundance of zebra mussels that made their way into it. These cleanings costed the industry over 2 million annually. Additionally experts estimate that around 100 million dollars in damage is done by aquatic invasive species in Michigan alone. While damage is expensive it isn't the only cost, prevention and repair are also costly and have significant economic impacts. One program that is intended to reduce sea lamprey cost 18 Million Dollars annually.

== Environmental effects ==
In addition to these economic effects the invasive species greatly harm the natural environment. Sea lamprey significantly reduce the populations of many native fish, and other species such as zebra mussels and grass carp destroy natural aquatic vegetation and mussels. As mentioned Zebra and quagga mussels have significantly altered the Great Lakes' food web by consuming large amounts of phytoplankton and zooplankton, which are essential food sources for native fish species. One population that has been negatively impacted by Sea lamprey is Lake Trout, which have significantly decreased in population size, leading to an imbalance in the Great Lakes ecosystem. Another impact of invasive species is disruption of nutrient cycles, Several invasive species disrupt nutrient cycling in aquatic ecosystems, with zebra mussels concentrating phosphorus and increasing water clarity, which can lead to the formation of harmful algal blooms.

== Michigan's Natural Resources and Environmental Protection Act ==
The Natural Resources and Environmental Protection Act (NREPA) was created in 1994 and went into effect on March 30, 1995. It is the primary governing legislation on environmental laws and protections in the state of Michigan. It contains all laws regarding invasive aquatic species and environmental protections and control against them.

=== Prohibited and restricted species ===
Part 413 of NREPA lists what species are prohibited and restricted in the state of Michigan and bans the sale, possession, and import of them. There are currently 56 species listed as prohibited or restricted in Michigan. This includes 17 species of fish, 11 species of mollusks, and 21 species of aquatic plants. This list is regularly amended through Invasive Species Orders. In 2014, the Michigan Department of Natural Resources added 9 species to the prohibited species list. This included the New Zealand mud snail, stone moroko, zander, wels catfish, killer shrimp, yabby, golden mussel and red swamp crayfish. The NREPA was amended again a year later, adding the water soldier to the prohibited species list. The latest amendment to the list was in 2020 when the marbled crayfish was added. In addition to the list of prohibited and restricted species, NREPA provides guidelines on the control and treatment of "aquatic nuisance species". In Part 33, it defines an aquatic nuisance species as "an organism that lives or propagates, or both, within the aquatic environment and that impairs the use or enjoyment of the waters of the state".

==== Boating laws ====
Before 2019, Michigan law only required that no watercraft be placed into Michigan waters if any aquatic plants were attached to them. But on March 21, 2019, the Natural Resources and Environmental Protection Act was amended to provide more protection of waterways against invasive species. It amended Part 413 of NREPA, by providing additional actions that watercraft users must take before removing and transporting any watercraft over land. Users are required to remove all drain plugs and drain all bilges, ballast tanks, and live wells of the watercraft. In addition, they must ensure that no aquatic organisms are inside or attached to the watercraft or vehicle transporting the watercraft. Anyone that does not comply with this law can be fined up to $100.

The Aquatic Nuisance Species Task Force runs a campaign called "Stop Aquatic Hitchhikers!" that encourages boaters and waterway users to follow the boating laws outlined in NREPA. It is partnered with the Michigan Department of Natural Resources and Department of Environmentally Quality. The campaign also seeks to educate people on invasive and nuisance species.

==== Fish and bait release laws ====
The Michigan Department of Natural Resources implemented the Fish Disease Control Order (Fisheries Order 245) on March 21, 2019. It was added to the NREPA to provide further protection of Michigan waterways, fish hatcheries, and aquatic species against aquatic diseases and invasive species. It states that the release and use of fish and baitfish is illegal unless they were caught in that specific waterway or in a physically connecting waterway. All baitfish that are not used cannot be disposed of in any waterway. Violators of this law can be fined up to $100.

==== Registration to sell non-native aquatic species ====
Anyone that sells living, non-native aquatic species is required to register annually with the Michigan Department of Natural Resources. It was one of the many laws added through the March 21, 2019 NREPA amendment. Registration is required for each location that a sale is made, along with a displayed registration confirmation number. Whenever a sale is made, the seller is required to report the name and number of each aquatic species sold to the Michigan Department of Natural Resources. There are some exemptions to the registration requirement under the Michigan Aquaculture Development Act and Part 459 of NREPA. These involve breeding in private waterways. Exemptions are also allowed for one-time sales of 20 or less aquatic organisms of the same species.

== Ballast water management laws ==
Michigan follows the federal ballast water management standards set by the United States Coast Guard and the National Invasive Species Act of 1996. Michigan state law requires that all vessels and watercraft that operate on the Great Lakes and St. Lawrence River are to report their compliance with the ballast water management standards. The Department of Environment, Great Lakes, and Energy (EGLE) handles all reporting and ensures compliance of ballast water management practices.

== Michigan invasive species management plans and strategies ==
In addition to the invasive species laws in NREPA, Michigan has several management plans and strategies in place to control and prevent the introduction and spread of aquatic invasive species.

== Aquatic Invasive Species State Management Plan ==
The Aquatic Invasive Species State Management Plan was created to help prevent new aquatic invasive species (AIS) from being introduced as well as prevent existing populations from growing and dispersing to other areas. The plan was also created to reduce the negative effects of AIS and assist agencies in responding to new AIS threats. It was approved on June 17, 2013, by the federal Aquatic Nuisance Species Task Force. This plan replaced Michigan's Nonindigenous Aquatic Nuisance Species State Management Plan (1996), which was amended in 2002. It was one of the first state management plans in the United States to be approved by the federal Aquatic Nuisance Species Task Force.

== Status and strategies for established aquatic invasive species ==
There are 18 different status and strategy guides for aquatic invasive species residing in Michigan. This includes extensive guides on the history and management practices of invasive fish, mollusks, insects, and plants.
