= Regrowth inside ballast tanks =

Ballast water discharge from other sides of the world cause a certain type of pollution different from an emission type pollution as it introduces invasive species that can literally cause domestic species to go extinct.

After delivering their cargo, empty commercial ships need to take up water from the port of arrival in order to maintain stability and ensure safe navigation conditions before heading back to the port of departure. This water, called ballast water, which contains aquatic organisms typical of the port of arrival, is stored in ballast tanks and is ultimately discharged at the port of departure when the ship is ready to be re-loaded. During this process, aquatic organisms capable of surviving in ballast water are released into new environments and can therefore become invasive species, causing serious economic and public health issues.

Following the ratification of the International Maritime Organization (IMO)’s Ballast Water Management (BWM) Convention, commercial ships will have to treat their ballast water in order to comply with maximum discharge standards established for organisms in different size categories (IMO’s D-2 Standards and US Coast Guard Standards). However, some organisms are capable of surviving or even recovering after harsh treatments, leading to regrowth in ballast water tanks before discharge. In order to minimise regrowth and hence avoid exceeding discharge limits, different criteria such as duration of the journey, ballast water tanks capacity and water flow rate at intake and discharge, among others, should be considered when choosing an appropriate type-approved ballast water treatment system (BWTS).

== Ballast water treatment systems (BWTS) ==
As of 2012, no single ballast water treatment method, or even a combination of primary (e.g. mechanical/physical separation) and secondary (e.g. active chemical substances) methods, can remove or inactivate all organisms in ballast water. Furthermore, some treatments are more effective in removing microorganisms such as bacteria, whereas others are better at killing larger organisms such as phytoplankton (e.g. diatoms) and zooplankton (e.g., copepods).

There are currently over 50 IMO type-approved BWTS on the market to choose from. These include the use of technologies such as UV irradiation, ozonation, electrochlorination, hydrodynamic cavitation and ultrasound, among others, applied as stand-alone or combined treatments. The US Coast Guard requires BWTS as per 46 CFR 162.060, and began approving in 2016.

== Regrowth ==
Surviving organisms have the potential to regrow after treatment and, depending on the duration of the voyage and the prevailing conditions, this regrowth could lead to exceeding the maximum number of aquatic organisms that can be discharged according to the established standards.

Both phytoplankton and zooplankton have been shown to be capable of surviving in ballast water tanks for up to 23 days. There is also evidence showing that different phytoplanktonic organisms can regrow within 4 to 20 days of incubating in favourable conditions. Bacteria that survive treatment have an even higher potential for regrowth, as they benefit from the death of other organisms in two different ways (i) nutrients essential for bacterial growth are released in the form of dissolved organic matter and, (ii) there is a decrease in the number of predators that would otherwise eat them. Overall, bacterial regrowth has been observed after 18 hrs to 7 days of applying different treatments.

Therefore, the scientific evidence currently available supports the idea that it is not an issue of “IF regrowth” but “WHEN regrowth”.

== Considerations ==
Timescales are very important when considering regrowth. For instance, if ballast water is treated at intake and held in ballast tanks for over a week before discharge, then the organisms surviving the treatment could have enough time to increase in numbers and potentially exceed discharge standards before the end of the voyage.

Every BWTS has its advantages and disadvantages and ship owners and ship operators should consider the benefits and limitations of different systems before making an educated choice based on their requirements. The issue of regrowth should be taken seriously and should be taken into account when choosing an appropriate BWTS.

== See also ==
- Ballast Water Management
- Environmental impact of shipping
