= Pacific Responder =

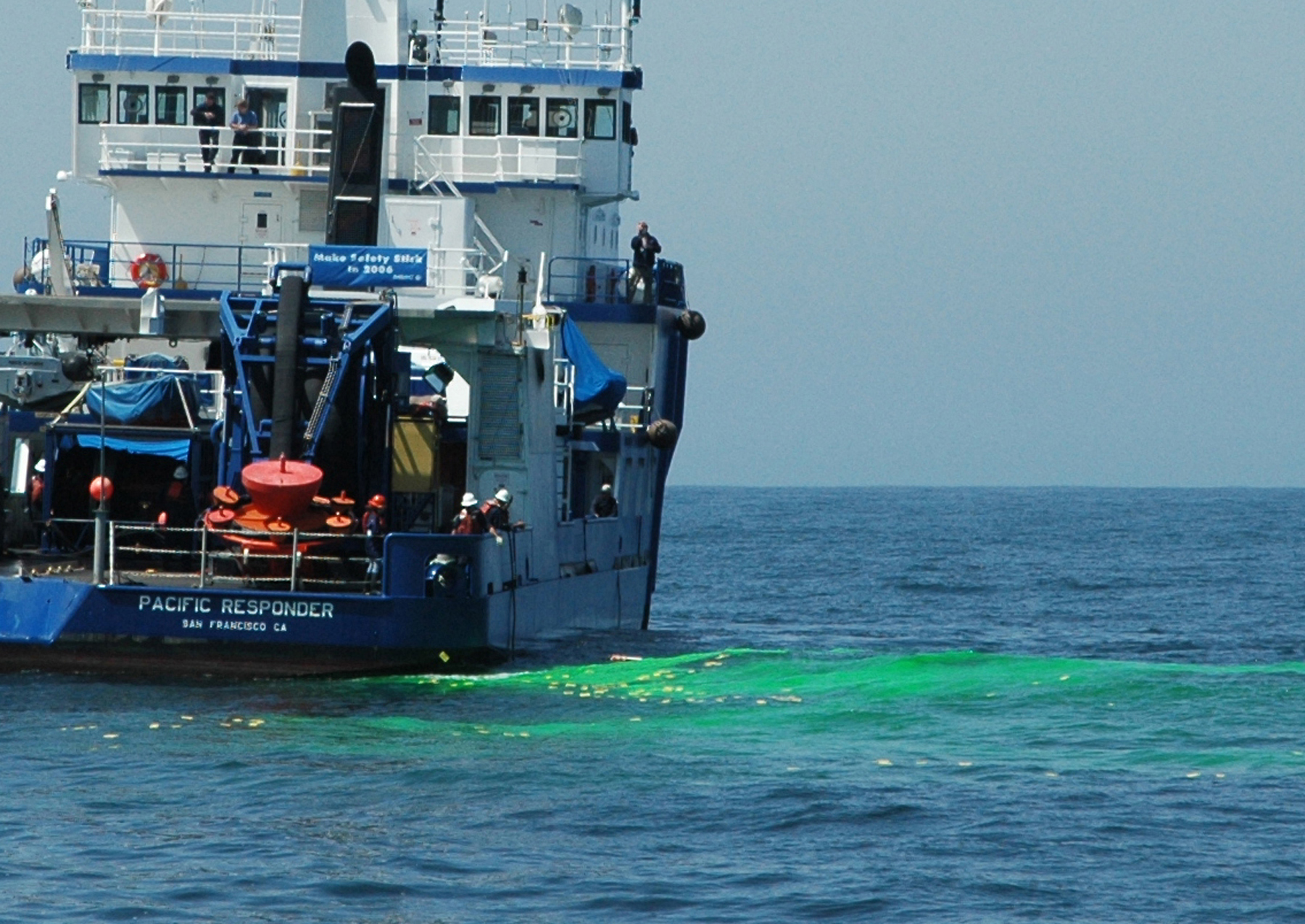
- Marine Spill Response Corp. (MSRC) crew members aboard Pacific Responder during the "Safe Seas 2006 Oil Spill Response Exercise". 9 August 2006.

History
- Name: Pacific Responder
- Owner: Marine Spill Response Corp.; Herndon, Virginia
- Port of registry: United States, Norfolk, Virginia
- Builder: VT Halter Marine, Inc. (formerly Moss Point Marine, Inc.), Escatawpa, Mississippi
- Completed: 1992
- Acquired: 01 January 1993
- Identification: ABS class no: 9300196; Call sign: WBO8588; IMO number: 9043885; MMSI no.: 366605000; USCG Doc. No.: 983104
- Status: Operational

General characteristics
- Class & type: ABS A1, Oil Recovery Vessel Class 1, AMS
- Tonnage: 488 GT; 354 NT
- Length: 63 m (207 ft)
- Beam: 13 m (43 ft)
- Depth: 5 m (16 ft)
- Deck clearance: 7.33 m (24.0 ft)
- Installed power: 2 × Caterpillar model 3512 DITA diesel engines (2 x 954.88 kW); 3 × 250 kW auxiliary generators
- Capacity: Freshwater 76 m^{3} (2,700 cu ft); Fuel oil 409 m^{3} (14,400 cu ft); Tank ballast 443 m^{3} (15,600 cu ft)

Pacific Responder is a Responder-class oil-skimming vessel registered in Norfolk, Virginia and based in San Francisco, California.

Pacific Responder and her sister ship, California Responder, operated off the coast of Louisiana in the Gulf of Mexico during the Deepwater Horizon oil spill. The vessels sailed to the gulf from their home ports in California to assist in the containment efforts.
