= Ballast water regulation in the United States =

Ballast water discharge from other sides of the world cause a certain type of pollution different from an emission type pollution as it introduces invasive species that can literally cause domestic species to go extinct.

Ballast water discharge typically contains a variety of biological materials, including plants, animals, viruses, and bacteria. These materials often include non-native, nuisance, exotic species that can cause extensive ecological and economic damage to aquatic ecosystems. Ballast water discharges are believed to be the leading source of invasive species in U.S. marine waters, thus posing public health and environmental risks, as well as significant economic cost to industries such as water and power utilities, commercial and recreational fisheries, agriculture, and tourism. Studies suggest that the economic cost just from introduction of pest mollusks (zebra mussels, the Asian clam, and others) to U.S. aquatic ecosystems is more than $6 billion per year.

The zebra mussel, native to the Caspian and Black Seas arrived in Lake St. Clair in the ballast water of a transatlantic freighter in 1988 and within 10 years spread to all of the five neighbouring Great Lakes. The economic cost of this introduction has been estimated by the U.S. Fish and Wildlife Service at about $5 billion.

Congress passed the National Invasive Species Act of 1996 (NISA) in an attempt to control aquatic invasive species. The Coast Guard issued ballast water regulations, pursuant to NISA, in 2012. The Environmental Protection Agency (EPA) has issued discharge permits for controlling ballast water under Clean Water Act authority.

== Background and litigation ==
=== Petitions for regulatory coverage of ballast water discharges ===
Because of the growing problem of introduction of invasive species into U.S. waters via ballast water, in January 1999, a number of conservation organizations, fishing groups, native American tribes, and water agencies petitioned EPA to repeal its 1973 regulation exempting ballast water discharge under the Clean Water Act (CWA). They argued that ballast water should be regulated as the “discharge of a pollutant” under the National Pollutant Discharge Elimination System (NPDES) permit program. EPA rejected the petition in September 2003, saying that the “normal operation” exclusion is long-standing agency policy, to which Congress has acquiesced twice (in 1979 and 1996) when it considered the issue of aquatic nuisance species in ballast water and did not alter EPA's CWA interpretation. Further, EPA said that other ongoing federal activities related to control of invasive species in ballast water are likely to be more effective than changing the NPDES rules. Until recently, these efforts to limit ballast water discharges by cruise ships and other vessels were primarily voluntary, except in the Great Lakes. Since 2004, all vessels equipped with ballast water tanks must have a ballast water management plan.

=== Northwest Environmental Advocates, et al. v. U.S. EPA ===
After the denial of their administrative petition, the environmental groups filed a lawsuit seeking to force EPA to rescind the regulation that exempts ballast water discharges from CWA permitting. In March 2005, a federal district court ruled in favor of the groups, and in September 2006, the court remanded the matter to EPA with an order that the challenged regulation be set aside by September 30, 2008. The district court rejected EPA's contention that Congress had previously acquiesced in exempting the “normal operation” of vessels from CWA permitting and disagreed with EPA's argument that the court's two-year deadline creates practical difficulties for the agency and the affected industry. Significantly, while the focus of the environmental groups’ challenge was principally to EPA's permitting exemption for ballast water discharges, the court's ruling — and its mandate to EPA to rescind the exemption in 40 CFR §122.3(a) — applies fully to other types of vessel discharges that are covered by the regulatory exemption, including graywater and bilge water. The ruling was upheld by the Ninth Circuit Court of Appeals in 2008.

== Regulatory requirements ==
=== 2008 Vessel General Permit ===
In June 2007, EPA requested public comment on regulating ballast water discharges from ships, an information-gathering prelude to a potential rulemaking in response to the district court's order. In 2008 the Agency published a Vessel General Permit (VGP) regulating vessel discharges. Included in the permit coverage were ballast water discharges from all commercial vessels, including fishing vessels. The permit required the use of best management practices (BMPs) for controlling ballast water, but did not include numeric pollutant discharge limits.

=== Clean Boating Act of 2008 ===
The Clean Boating Act of 2008 exempted recreational vessels from the requirement to obtain NPDES discharge permits, but vessel operators must implement BMPs to control their discharges.

=== 2011 study ===
A 2011 National Research Council study provided advice on developing data and methodologies for setting numeric permit limits. The study found that determining the exact number of organisms that could be expected to launch a new population is complex. It suggested an initial step of establishing a benchmark for the concentrations of organisms in ballast water below current levels, and then using models to analyze experimental and field-based data to help inform future decisions about ballast water discharge standards.

=== 2012 Coast Guard Standards for Ballast Water Discharge Final Ruling ===
Congress passed the National Invasive Species Act in 1996. Organisms targeted by NISA are categorized as aquatic nuisance species, including in particular zebra mussel and the Eurasian ruffe. NISA authorizes regulation of ballast water, a key factor in the spread of aquatic invasive species.

To minimize the spread of invasive species in U.S. waterways, EPA and the Coast Guard developed plans to regulate the concentration of living organisms discharged in the ballast water of ships. The Coast Guard issued ballast water regulations, pursuant to NISA, in 2012. The Coast Guard requires ballast water treatment systems and began approving these systems in 2016. The requirements generally apply to all non-recreational vessels equipped with ballast tanks.

Before the final ruling in ballast water standards in 2012, many vessels arriving from outside the EEZ were able to be exempted from safety regulations by exchanging ballast water mid-ocean. Vessels also had to report number of ballast water tanks, each tank's volume, and origin of the ballast water to be discharged. Areas overrun with invasive species should be avoided for both uptake and discharge of ballast water.

The new regulations have the same requirements for avoiding uptake and discharge in sensitive areas and for recording and reporting ballast water in vessels. The management of ballast water were expanded to include training and safety procedures as well as maintenance and removal practices of fouling species and sediment. Ship owners could also request an extension on the compliance date for this new ruling if compliance was not possible by the set implementation date, which for new vessels was Dec 1, 2013, for existing vessels of less than 1,500 cubic meters or greater than 5,000 cubic meters was Jan 1, 2016, and for vessels 1,500-5000 cubic meters was Jan 1, 2014.

This ruling also implemented standards for the allowable concentration of living organisms in ballast water discharge. Organisms greater than 50 micrometers have to be in concentration of less than 10 organisms per cubic meter, and organisms less than 50 but greater than 10 micrometers have to be in concentration of less than 10 organisms per milliliter. Microorganisms which serve as indicators for problematic ballast water also have set standards per 100 mL. There must be less than 1 colony forming unit toxicogenic Vibrio cholerae, less than 250 cfu of E. coli, and less than 100 cfu of intestinal enterococci.

Also established by this ruling was the approval process of Ballast Water Management Systems. Independent laboratories vetted by USCG test the equipment, incorporating EPA Environmental Technology Verification Program land-based protocols. For foreign-type approved systems installed before the compliance dates, a 5-year grandfather period was enacted, so long as the systems were approved in accordance with IMO Ballast Water Convention by the foreign administration.

This ruling's jurisdiction covers the US territorial sea (12 nautical miles), and vessels that depart the Great Lakes, go beyond the EEZ, and return, passing upstream of Snell Lock.

=== 2013-2014 EPA general permits ===
EPA published its latest Vessel General Permit in 2013. The permit sets numeric ballast water discharge limits for commercial vessels 79 feet (24 m) in length or greater. The limits are expressed as the maximum acceptable concentration of living organisms per cubic meter of ballast water. Approximately 69,000 vessels, both domestic and foreign flagged, are covered by the permit. EPA issued a separate permit for smaller commercial vessels in 2014.

The Coast Guard worked with EPA in developing the scientific basis and the regulatory requirements in the VGP.

=== Permit moratorium extensions ===
Congress has extended the moratorium exempting NPDES permit coverage for small vessels (except ballast water) several times. Vessels smaller than 79 feet in length as well as commercial fishing vessels of all sizes were exempt from having to obtain an NPDES permit for incidental discharges, except for ballast water. The latest moratorium expired on January 19, 2018.

== See also ==
- Ballast water discharge and the environment
- Environmental issues in the United States
- Environmental impact of shipping
- Regulation of ship pollution in the United States
