= Swiftcraft Swift 18 =

1980s British recreational keelboat

The Swift 18 is an 18-foot yacht which was designed by Colin Sylvester and was in production in the UK between 1982 and 1990. Some 200–300 boats were made, most of which remain in the UK. The Swift 18 has four full-length berths, a sink, a cooker and room for a porta loo. With sitting headroom it is a comfortable weekend cruiser for a small family.

== Specifications ==
LOA Length	18 ft 0 in (5.49 m)	
Length waterline	16 ft 4 in (5 m)	
Beam Width	7 ft 11 in (2.41 m)	
Draft Keel down	3 ft 6 in (1.07 m)	
Draft Keel up	0 ft 9 in (0.22 m)	
Displacement	1520 lb (690 kg)	
Ballast	375 lb (170 kg)	
Rigging	Fractional sloop	
Sails	Main	94 ft^{2} (8.7 m^{2})
Sails	Working Jib	60 ft^{2} (5.6 m^{2})
Sails	Genoa	105 ft^{2} (9.8 m^{2})
Sails	Storm Jib	25 ft^{2} (2.3 m^{2})
Sails	Total sail area	199 ft^{2} (18.5 m^{2})
Spinnaker	199 ft^{2} (18.5 m^{2})	

I = 21 ft 6 in (6.55 m)

J = 7 ft 8 in (2.34 m)

P = 23 ft 9 in (7.25 m)

E = 7 ft 1 in (2.12 m)

== History ==
The Swift 18 was unveiled at the 1981 Southampton Boat show. It was originally intended to be made from aluminium but went into production in GRP. The boat was designed to comply with the French micro cupper rules with a maximum sail area of 199 ft2.

However it is not an all out racing boat and is rather a comfortable trailer sailor, capable of coastal cruising for small families. The boat is virtually unsinkable with foam buoyancy built in. It was met with enthusiastic reviews from the press and went on to sell some 200-300 boats.

The original manufacturer, JCA, built about 220 boats from 1982 to 1985. The company changed name to Swiftcraft and relocated to Shamrock Quay in Southampton during this period.

In 1985 the business was sold and ended up in the hands of Honnor Marine at Totnes Devon. They built a modified boat, marketed as the 300 series. These featured a number of modifications from the original boats, reputedly for cost reduction reasons. Notably these changes include different toerails and non-tapered masts. Honnor Marine built about 35 to 40 boats.

Then around 1988 Marlin International bought the rights, moulds and materials from Honnor Marine. Some of the cost reductions that Honnor Marine had made were reversed and the new boats were marketed as the 400 series, with manufacturing returning to Southampton. Only about 10 of the 400 series boats were built before production ceased in around 1990.

== Future production ==
The moulds for the Swift 18 have recently been acquired by Boats4fun, a family run Boatbuilders in East Sussex, the moulds are currently being re-furbished ready for building the first boat for RCD certification.

The "new" Swift 18 will be similar in layout to those previously built by Swiftcraft and Honnor Marine but the boat will be built with cruising in mind rather than its original target audience of Micro Cup racers.

Where possible all materials and components will be sourced from UK manufacturers.

Boats4fun subsequently announced that due to a change in premises, offers were being invited for the Swift 18 moulds
