= California Responder =

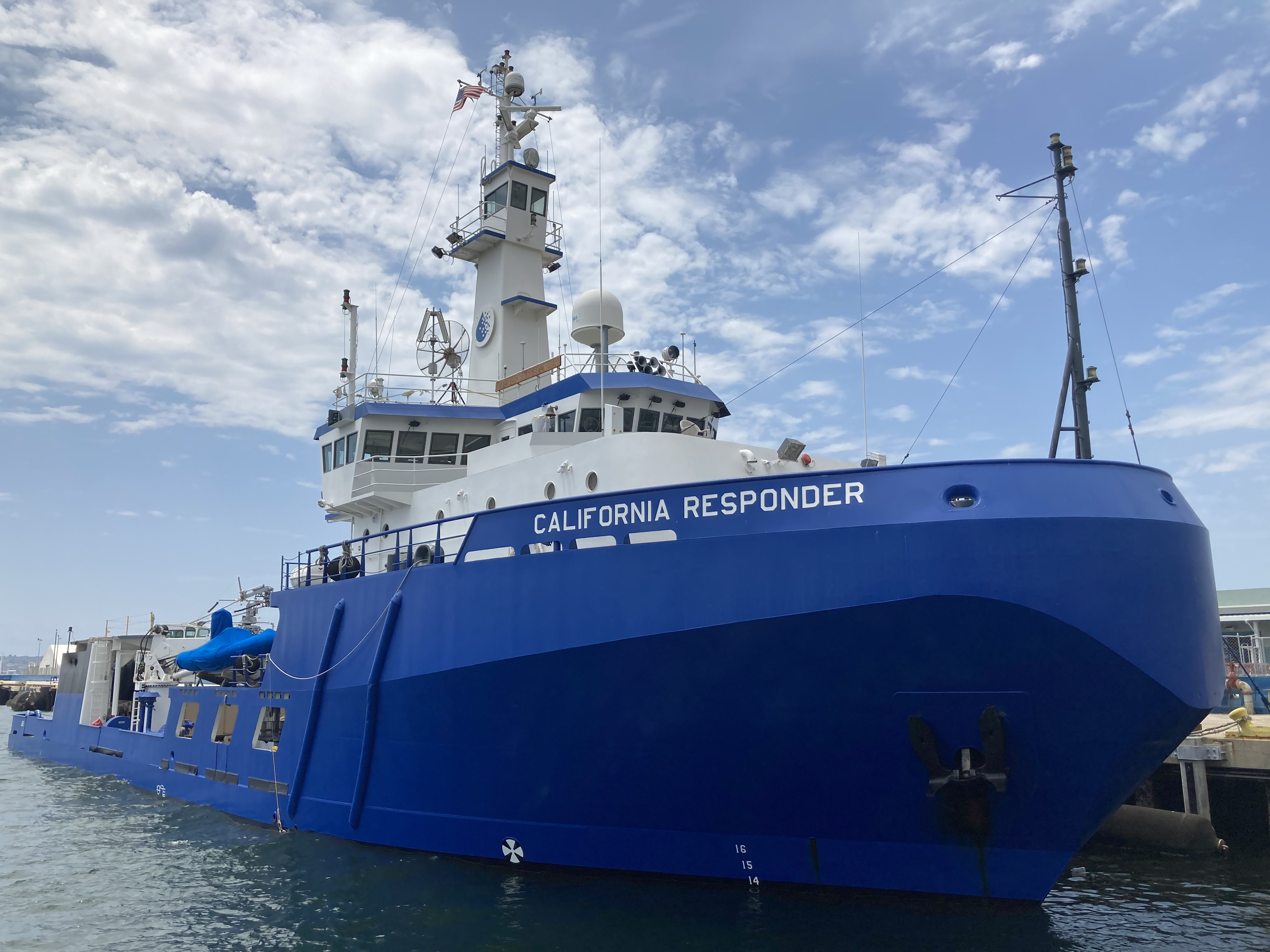
- California Responder in San Diego, CA

History
- Name: California Responder
- Owner: Marine Spill Response Corp.; Herndon, Virginia
- Port of registry: United States, Norfolk, Virginia
- Builder: VT Halter Marine, Inc. (formerly Moss Point Marine, Inc., Escatawpa, Mississippi)
- Completed: 1992
- Acquired: 01 November 1992
- Identification: ABS class no: 9203788; Call sign: WBO8591; IMO number: 9043873; MMSI no.: 366608000; USCG Doc. No.: 983102
- Status: Operational

General characteristics
- Class & type: ABS A1, Oil Recovery Vessel Class 1, AMS
- Tonnage: 488 GT; 354 NT
- Length: 63 m (207 ft)
- Beam: 13 m (43 ft)
- Depth: 5 m (16 ft)
- Deck clearance: 7.33 m (24.0 ft)
- Installed power: 2 × Caterpillar model 3512 DITA diesel engines (2 × 954.88 kW); 3 × 250 kW auxiliary generators
- Capacity: Freshwater 76 m^{3} (2,700 cu ft); Fuel oil 409 m^{3} (14,400 cu ft); Tank ballast 443 m^{3} (15,600 cu ft)

California Responder is a Responder-class oil-skimming vessel registered in Norfolk, Virginia, USA, and based in Port Hueneme, California. California Responder and her sister ship, Pacific Responder, operated off the coast of Louisiana in the Gulf of Mexico during the Deepwater Horizon oil spill. The vessels sailed to the gulf from their home ports in California to assist in the containment efforts.
