= Kingston valve =

Valve on the exterior of a ship's hull

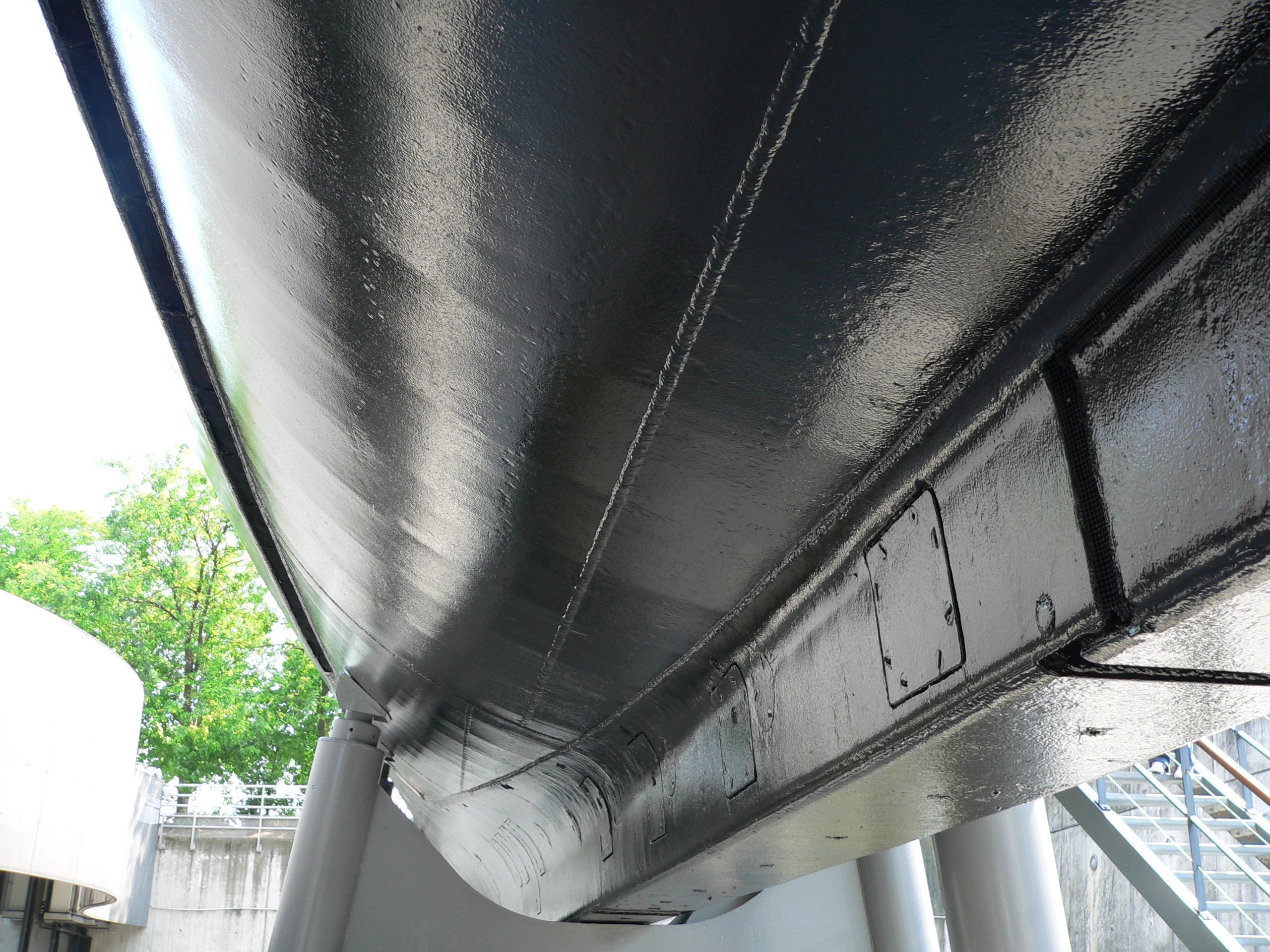
Kingston valves of Argonaute are visible on her keel

A Kingston valve is a type of valve fitted in the bottom of a ship's plating that connects the sea to the ship's piping and storage tanks.

A Kingston valve is a type of seacock. It is arranged so that, under normal operating conditions, sea pressure keeps the valve closed. When opened from the ship's interior, the Kingston valve allows sea water to enter the tank.

The mechanism was introduced in 1837 by John Kingston (1786–1847), an English engineer after whom it is named.

== Surface ships ==
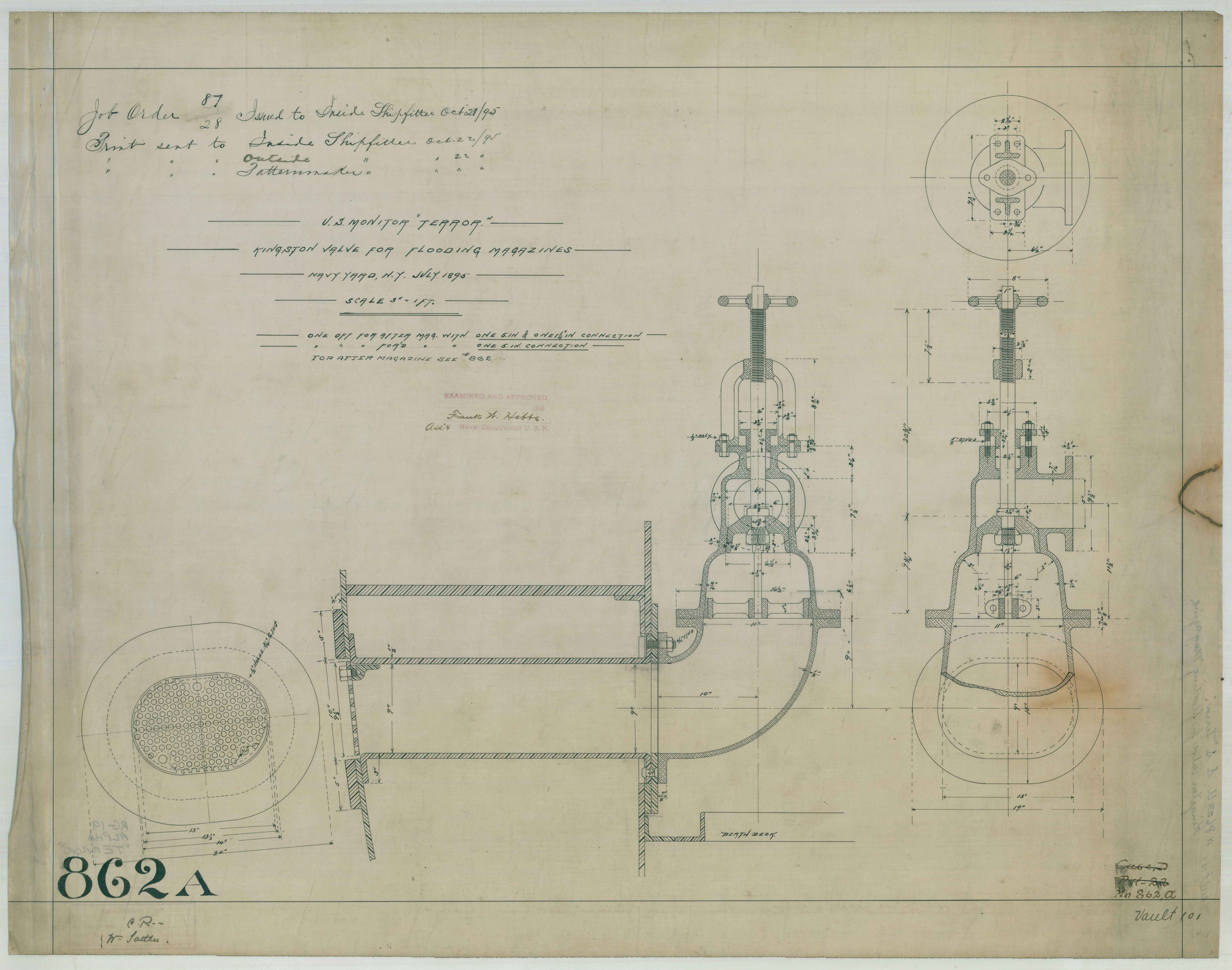
USS Terror (BM-4) magazine flooding kingston valve drawing

On surface ships, Kingston valves are fitted on systems such as fuel tanks, water tanks, and ballast tanks. The valve allows sea water to enter the tank. For fuel tanks, the purpose was cleaning the tanks. On water tanks, the Kingston valve gave ship engineers the ability to blow out increasingly salty water from the system, by safely and easily operating the valve from the interior of the ship. Sea water was used in the ship's steam-powered propulsion system, with water being injected and ejected from the boilers. Water, controlled by a Kingston valve, could be deliberately taken on board to act as ballast below the waterline.

Some shipboard safety systems may also incorporate Kingston valves; selective flooding of compartments is a common damage control system on warships. Artillery magazines are generally designed to be rapidly floodable to prevent a fire from causing a catastrophic magazine explosion. Counterflooding of compartments is used to cancel out listing from damage, or to deliberately cause a ship to list to expose damage below the waterline for repair.

== Submarines ==
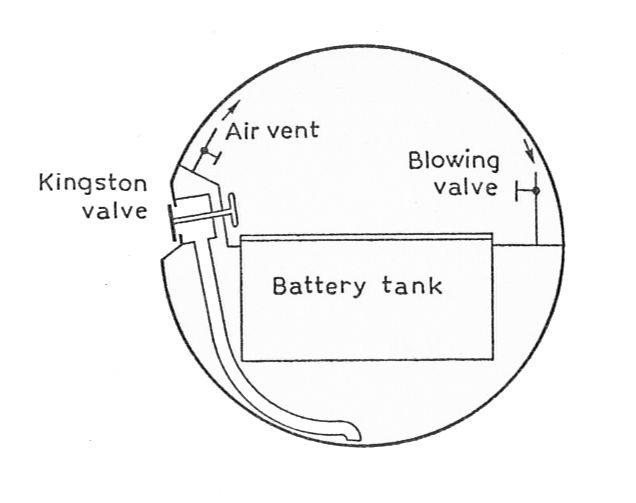
Early submarine cross-section, before saddle tanks

On vintage submarines, Kingston valves are fitted at the bottom of certain ballast tanks, such as safety, negative, and bow buoyancy tanks. The submarine's ballast tank valves are used to admit water when the submarine dives. The valves allow water to enter the ballast tanks, while the enclosed air escapes through the open main vents at the top of the ballast tanks. During peacetime the Kingston valves are closed when the submarine is on the surface, the valves and vents being opened to dive, but to reduce the time required for diving in wartime the Kingston valves are left permanently open when at sea, the water being kept out of the ballast tanks by the pressure of the trapped air. This pressure is released when the vents are opened for diving, allowing the water to enter through the open Kingston valves.

In general, main ballast tanks have the Kingston valve atop the tank. This Kingston valve, controllable both manually and hydraulically, is known by some as main vent operating gear. Main ballast tanks are in pairs, one on each side of the boat. One Kingston valve serves a pair, but each tank has a vent riser, with air connections and stop valves in the vent riser. The tank bottom is open to the sea through flood ports. The trapped air in the tank provides positive buoyancy while on the surface, although sea water sloshing in through the flood ports must be removed occasionally from the ballast tank(s) when cruising on the surface by means of low pressure air. The tank is capped by a vent riser, a pipe coming out of the top of the tank that terminates at a Kingston valve. In the vent riser is a valve that when shut, prevents flooding the tank when the submarine is rigged for surface. When the sub is rigged for dive, this valve is opened and flooding the tank becomes an option. Normally, the tank is flooded when the Kingston valve is opened, usually hydraulically from the control room. This Kingston valve then is left open until time to surface comes. This is because a slight leak of air from the air line provided to blow the tank into the vent riser could slowly make the boat more buoyant. When surfacing, the Kingston valve gets shut so the introduced air gets trapped in the tank and pushes the water out the tank's bottom through the flood port. The Kingston valve associated with each ballast tank can be operated manually. The vent riser valves get opened or shut manually during the rig for surface or rig for dive procedure.

== Use in deliberate sinking ==
Kingston valves can be used to scuttle (deliberately sink) a ship. Famous examples include the Russian battleships Sevastopol and Potemkin in 1905, the interned Imperial German High Seas Fleet at Scapa Flow in 1919, the Japanese battleship Tosa in 1925, or the German aircraft carrier Graf Zeppelin in 1945. The Imperial Japanese Navy battleship Kirishima was scuttled by the opening of her Kingston valves, after she had received extensive damage during the Second Naval Battle of Guadalcanal.

== See also ==
- Vent (submarine)
