= Ballast water discharge and the environment =

Harmful effects of ballast water discharge

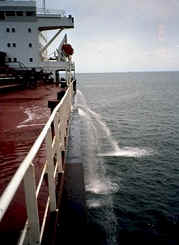
A cargo ship loading ballast water into the tank.

Diagram showing the water pollution of the seas from untreated ballast water discharges

Ballast water discharges by ships can have a negative impact on the marine environment. The discharge of ballast water and sediments by ships is governed globally under the Ballast Water Management Convention, since its entry into force in September 2017. It is also controlled through national regulations, which may be separate from the Convention, such as in the United States.

Cruise ships, large tankers, and bulk cargo carriers use a huge amount of ballast water, which is often taken on in the coastal waters in one region after ships discharge wastewater or unload cargo, and discharged at the next port of call, wherever more cargo is loaded. Ballast water discharge typically contains a variety of biological materials, including plants, animals, viruses, and bacteria. These materials often include non-native, nuisance, and exotic species that can cause extensive ecological and economic damage to aquatic ecosystems, along with serious human health issues including death. Although similarly harmful to the environment, ballast water discharge is different from bilge pollution, which occurs when pollutants from a ship's heavy machinery leak into the ocean.

== Discussion ==
Cruise ships, large tankers, and bulk cargo carriers use a tremendous amount of ballast water, which is often taken on in the coastal waters in one region after ships discharge wastewater or unload cargo, and discharged at the next port of call, wherever more cargo is loaded. Ballast water discharge typically contains a variety of biological materials, including plants, animals, viruses, and other microorganisms. These materials often include non-native, nuisance, and exotic species that can cause extensive ecological and economic damage to aquatic ecosystems and to humans as well. Ballast water may contain harmful pathogens and diseases that can be transferred to native species. For instance, Cholera. Ballast water discharges are also believed to be the leading source of invasive species in U.S. marine waters, thus posing public health and environmental risks, as well as significant economic cost to industries such as water and power utilities, commercial and recreational fisheries, agriculture, and tourism. A recent study suggests that if no action is taken on ballast water management, species invasion can propagate to any port in the world via global shipping network with an average of two intermediate stops.

Meanwhile, studies suggest that the economic cost just from introduction of pest mollusks (zebra mussels, the Asian clam, and others) to U.S. aquatic ecosystems is more than $6 billion per year.

In case of a bulk cargo ship, there is another environmental effect of ballast water. After unloading the payload a bulk carrier cannot simply return to the starting point, but it must load ballast to get the propeller submerged below water surface. The weight of the ballast increases fuel consumption compared to a hypothetical situation that the ship did not need ballast.

A June 2011 National Research Council (United States) study provided advice on the process of setting regulatory limits. The study found that determining the exact number of organisms that could be expected to launch a new population is complex. It suggested an initial step of establishing a benchmark for the concentrations of organisms in ballast water below current levels, and then using models to analyze experimental and field-based data to help inform future decisions about ballast water discharge standards.

To minimize the spread of invasive species in U.S. waterways, the Environmental Protection Agency and the U.S. Coast Guard regulate the concentration of living organisms discharged in the ballast water of ships.

== Problematic species ==
There are hundreds of organisms carried in ballast water that cause problematic ecological effects outside of their natural range. The International Maritime Organization (IMO) lists the ten most unwanted species as:

- Cholera Vibrio cholerae (various strains)
- Cladoceran water flea Cercopagis pengoi
- Mitten crab Eriocheir sinensis
- Toxic algae (red/brown/green tides) (various species)
- Round goby Neogobius melanostomus
- North American comb jelly Mnemiopsis leidyi
- North Pacific seastar Asterias amurensis
- Zebra mussel Dreissena polymorpha
- Asian kelp Undaria pinnatifida
- European green crab Carcinus maenas

Other problematic species include:

- Spiny water flea Bythotrephes longimanus

== Ballast water issues by country ==
=== New Zealand ===
The ballast tanks in New Zealand carry animals and plants that kill ecosystems. Ballast tanks are only used in cargo ships there. Ballast water is controlled under the Biosecurity Act 1993.

=== Peru ===
A form of cholera, Vibrio cholerae, previously reported only in Bangladesh apparently arrived via ballast water in Peru in 1991, killing more than 10,000 people over the following three years.

=== United States ===
The zebra mussel, which is native to the Caspian and Black Seas, arrived in Lake St. Clair in the ballast water of a transatlantic freighter in 1988. Within 10 years it had spread to all of the five neighbouring Great Lakes. The economic cost of this introduction has been estimated by the U.S. Fish and Wildlife Service at about $5 billion.

Ballast water discharges are believed to be the leading source of invasive species in U.S. marine waters, thus posing public health and environmental risks, as well as significant economic cost to industries such as water and power utilities, commercial and recreational fisheries, agriculture, and tourism. Studies suggest that the economic cost just from introduction of pest mollusks (zebra mussels, the Asian clam, and others) to U.S. aquatic ecosystems is more than $6 billion per year.

Congress passed the National Invasive Species Act in 1996 in order to regulate ballast water discharges. The Coast Guard issued ballast water regulations in 2012. Under the authority of the Clean Water Act, the Environmental Protection Agency (EPA) published its latest Vessel General Permit in 2013. The permit sets numeric ballast water discharge limits for commercial vessels 79 feet (24 m) in length or greater. EPA issued a separate permit for smaller commercial vessels in 2014. The small vessel permit was repealed by Congress in 2018, and new vessel regulations are pending as of 2023.

=== Singapore ===
Among 818 ports in the Pacific region, Singapore alone accounts for an estimated 26 percent of cross-region (long range) species exchange. Via targeted ballast management on Singapore and a few other "influential" ports, cross-region species exchange to/from the Pacific region can be combinatorially reduced.

== IMO convention ==
To react to the growing concerns about environmental impact of ballast water discharge, the International Maritime Organization (IMO) adopted in 2004 the "International Convention for the Control and Management of Ships' Ballast Water and Sediments" to control the environmental damage from ballast water. The Convention will require all ships to implement a "Ballast water management plan" including a ballast water record book and carrying out ballast water management procedures to a given standard. Guidelines are given for additional measures then the guidelines.

The goals of the convention are to minimise damage to the environment by:

- Minimise the uptake of organisms during ballasting.
- Minimising the uptake of sediments during ballasting.
- Ballast water exchange while at sea (the ship should be minimum 200 nautical miles from shore with a depth of minimum 200 metres and can use the flow through or sequential method). At least 95 percent of the total ballast water should be exchanged.
- Treatment of the ballast water by chemical or mechanical means (UV radiation, filtration, deoxygenation, cavitation, ozone treatment)

Control measures include:

- International Ballast Water Management Certificate
- Ballast water management plan
- Ballast water record book

The IMO convention was ratified by enough countries and entered into force on September 8, 2017.

== Ballast water treatment ==
Ballast water treatment is implemented on ships through a combination of onboard systems and different operation standards that are designed to meet the international management standards. Integrated treatment processes are important to the implementation of treatment systems. With ballast water being taken onboard and then subjected to filtration to remove the larger particles and organisms, which is then followed up by either physical or chemical. Implementation of different treatments varies depending upon environmental factors such as the salinity, temperature, and water clarity.

Most modern ships use a combination of mechanical filtration and secondary treatments such as ultraviolet (UV) radiation. Mechanical filtration filtering out larger organisms or particles, followed by UV treatment that damages the DNA of leftover microorganism preventing them from reproducing. This combination of treatments is currently the most widely used and environmentally safe forms of ballast water treatment.

Port based ballast water management is a model of treatment that collects, contains, and treats ballast water at centralized facilities. Ports provide containment tanks where ships are able to discharge ballast water upon arrival, where the water is then collected and treated using a combination of physical and chemical methods. This port based model allows for better operational efficiency by allowing ballast water discharge and cargo handling to happen at the same time.

Another method of treatment is one that combines multiple treatment stages and automated controls to ensure consistency between treatments. In the initial stages of this treatment the ballast water passes through a self cleaning mechanical filter that captures and filters out solids and large organisms. After this filtration it undergoes UV based disinfection that is enhanced by oxidation processes, targeting the smaller organisms that passed through the filter. It then has an automated cleaning cycle that is performed after its filtering is done. This process is fully automated and is designed to function continuously with minimal disruptions with ship operations.

The economics of ballast water treatment varies depending upon the technology that is used, as well as the location. The two main types of treatment ultraviolet and ultrafiltration have varying costs. For on board ship treatments ultrafiltration comes out as being significantly more expensive than ultraviolet. With the cost of ultrafiltration being about two to five times more expensive than that of its counterpart as it has more complex infrastructure. For individual vessels ultraviolet treatment has come to be more economically viable. Opposed to this port based ultrafiltration treatments benefits due to scale. By treating large amounts of ballast water at ports can make it more economically viable than ultraviolet. Port based ultrafiltration can also prove to be more efficient in removing organisms and any other foreign objects. Multiple factors play into the cost of treatments, such as water quality and operational strategies.

== See also ==
- Environmental issues with shipping
- Marine pollution
