= Ballast Water Management Convention =

International maritime treaty regarding Ships' Ballast Water and Sediments

Ballast Water Management Convention BWM Convention
International Convention for the Control and Management of Ships' Ballast Water and Sediments
Signed and ratified
Acceded or succeeded
Not participating
- Signed: 13 February 2004
- Location: London, United Kingdom
- Effective: 8 September 2017
- Condition: Ratifications by at least 30 parties, whose combined merchant fleets' gross tonnage includes at least 35% of the world's
- Parties: 86 (15 July 2021)
- Depositary: UN Secretary-General
- Languages: Arabic, Chinese, English, French, Russian, and Spanish

The International Convention for the Control and Management of Ships' Ballast Water and Sediments (Ballast Water Management Convention or BWM Convention) is a 2004 international maritime treaty which requires signatory flag states to ensure that ships flagged by them comply with standards and procedures for the management and control of ships' ballast water and sediments. The Convention aims to prevent the spread of harmful aquatic organisms from one region to another and halt damage to the marine environment from ballast water discharge, by minimising the uptake and subsequent discharge of sediments and organisms. From 2024, all ships are required to have approved Ballast Water Management Treatment System, according to the D2 standard (see below). Existing ships are required to install an approved system, which may cost up to US$5 million per ship to install. To assist with implementation, the IMO has released 14 Guidance documents in regards to the Convention including the G2 Guidelines for Ballast Water Sampling, G4 Guidelines for Ballast Water management and G6 Guidelines for Ballast Water Exchange. As of 15 July 2021, 86 countries were contracting States to the BWM Convention (representing 91.12% of the gross tonnage of the global merchant fleet).

== Development and entry into force ==
The first scientifically recognised occurrence of a non-indigenous marine species being transported in ships water occurred in the North Sea in 1903, with the Asian phytoplankton Odontella appearing. The issue became more prevalent with the increase in shipping in the late 20th century and the issue was raised for the first time at the IMO in 1988. Following several years of development, the convention was adopted by the International Maritime Organization in 2004. To enter into force, the Convention required ratification by a minimum of 30 States, representing 35% of world merchant shipping tonnage, subject to which it would enter into force 12 months later. On 8 September 2016, Finland acceded to the convention, bringing the contracting states to 52 and the combined tonnage of States to 35.14%. This triggered the applicability of the entry into force date of the convention, which occurred on 8 September 2017. Since Finland's accession, a number of States have continued to ratify the treaty. By November 2018 there were 78 contracting States, representing 77.19 per cent of world merchant shipping tonnage. By September 2020, 79 countries had joined the convention.

== Requirements of the Convention ==
All international sea going ships under the Convention must implement a 'Ballast water management plan' that enables the ship to manage their ballast water and sediment discharge to a certain standard. The plan is designed to meet the requirements for compliance with the Convention and the G4 Guidelines produced by the IMO. It includes standard operational guidance, planning and management, as well as additional details including sampling points and systems. Additionally all ships over 400GT must also carry a ballast water record book that details such requirements as the filling and discharge of each tank, according to time, date, location and the treatment applied to the water. The record book is used to demonstrate that the Convention requirements have been implemented and the ship is in compliance with the convention.

Ships that comply with the convention will receive and are duly required to carry an international ballast water management certificate. To receive a certificate, a ship will have to supply the necessary documentation showing compliance with the convention and a survey will be carried out on board. A survey may be carried out by a flag State, or by a Classification Society who have been authorised by a flag State. The convention is monitored by Port State Control, who must assess the ballast water management plan and its operation on the ship.

=== Standards ===
Under the convention, ships are required, according to a timetable of implementation, to comply with the D1 or D2 standards. The D1 standard requires ships to carry out a ballast water exchange, and specifies the volume of water that must be replaced. This standard involves exchanging the uptaken discharge water from the last port, with new sea water; it must occur at a minimum of 200 nautical miles from shore. The D2 standard is more stringent and requires the use of an approved ballast water treatment system. The system must ensure that only small levels of viable organisms remain left in water after treatment so as to minimise the environmental impact of shipping.

New ships will be required to install and comply with the D2 standard from 8 September 2017, once the convention has entered into force. Existing ships, who are subject to the phased implementation schedule, have potentially (depending on the renewal of their ship certificates) until 8 September 2024, by which time all ships will comply with the D2 standard.

It is also possible for ships to discharge ballast at approved shore reception facilities in ports, as article 5 requires that when cleaning or repair of a ships ballast tanks occurs, ports should have adequate reception facilities for the sediments. Facilities must include safe disposal arrangements, storage and treatment equipment, safe and suitable mooring and emergency arrangements and the necessary reducers for connections to ships.

The BWM Convention exempts certain categories of ships from its requirements, including vessels not designed to carry ballast water, warships and naval auxiliary ships operated by a State, ships engaged solely in non-commercial service, and vessels with permanent ballast water in sealed tanks. These include ships trading in a limited area, small vessels including sailboats and fishing vessels, vessels only operating on one coast and also FPSOs.

== Bibliography ==
- N. Anwar & Dr. L. Churcher, Ballast Water Management: Understanding the regulations and the treatment technologies available, 7th Edition, Witherby Publishing Group, 2016.
