= Ballast tank =

Compartment for holding liquid ballast

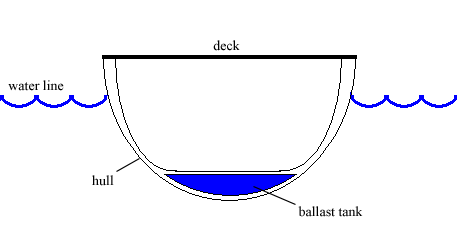
Cross section of a vessel with a single ballast tank at the bottom.

A ballast tank is a compartment within a boat, ship or other floating structure that holds water, which is used as ballast to provide hydrostatic stability for a vessel, to reduce or control buoyancy, as in a submarine, to correct trim or list, to provide a more even load distribution along the hull to reduce structural hogging or sagging stresses, or to increase draft, as in a semi-submersible vessel or platform, or a SWATH, to improve seakeeping. Using water in a tank provides easier weight adjustment than the stone or iron ballast used in older vessels, and makes it easy for the crew to reduce a vessel's draft when it enters shallower water, by temporarily pumping out ballast. Airships use ballast tanks mainly to control buoyancy and correct trim.

== History ==
The concept of ballast tanks, inspired by nature, can be seen in aquatic life forms like blowfish and the argonaut octopus, which regulate their buoyancy to move and survive in water. Humans have adapted and refined this idea for various applications, especially in maritime and underwater engineering.

The first recorded use of a ballast tank in a submarine was in David Bushnell's Turtle in 1776, which played a historic role as the first combat submarine. The ballast system allowed it to submerge and resurface effectively. Later, in 1849, Abraham Lincoln, then a practicing lawyer, patented a ballast tank system designed to help cargo ships navigate shallow waterways by adjusting their buoyancy. This innovation demonstrated how the concept of ballast has been repeatedly reinvented to meet specific challenges in marine technology.

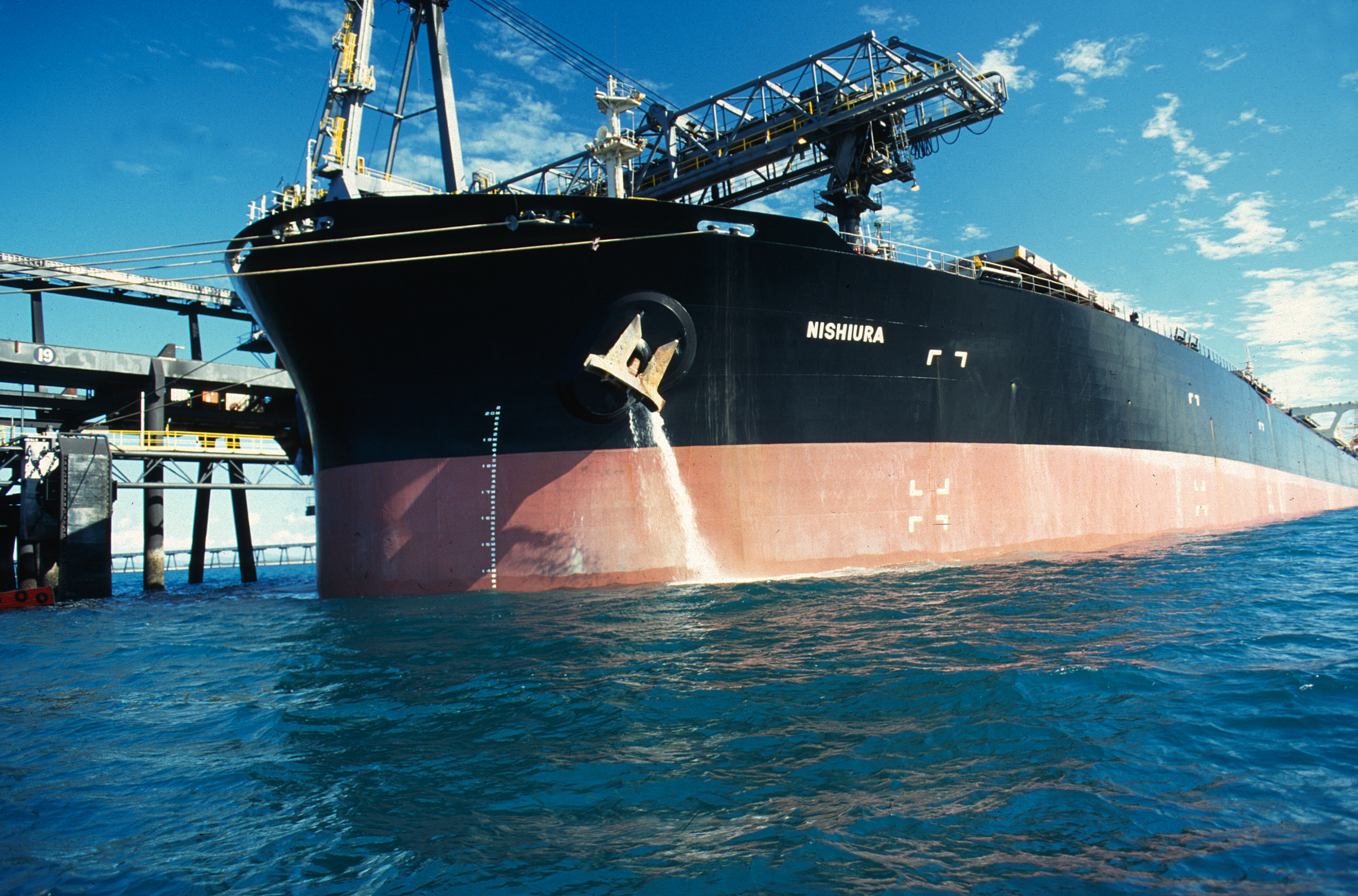
An example of such a model

== Ships ==
Ballast is used in surface vessels to alter the draft, trim, list and stability. It may also be used to modify structural load distribution, usually the longitudinal load distribution which affects hogging and sagging stresses. It may also be used to change the moments of inertia which affect motion in a seaway. International agreements under the Safety Of Life At Sea (SOLAS) Convention require that cargo vessels and passenger ships be constructed to withstand certain kinds of damage. The criteria specify the separation of compartments within the vessel, and the subdivision of those compartments. These International agreements rely on the states that signed the agreement to implement the regulations within their waters and on vessels entitled to fly their flag. Ballast may be used to compensate for stability losses due to flooding of some compartments.

The ballast is generally the water in which the vessel is floating at the time of ballasting, such as seawater, pumped into ballast tanks. Depending on the type of vessel, the tanks can be double bottom (extending across the breadth of the vessel), wing tanks (located on the outboard area from keel to deck) or hopper tanks (occupying the upper corner section between hull and main deck). These ballast tanks are connected to pumps that pump water in or out. Crews fill these tanks to add weight to the ship and improve its stability when it isn't carrying cargo. In extreme conditions, a crew may pump ballast water into dedicated cargo spaces to add extra weight during heavy weather or to pass under low bridges.

== Submarines ==
Ballast tank locations on a submarine.

In submersibles and submarines, ballast tanks are used to control the buoyancy of the vessel.

Some submersibles, such as bathyscaphes, dive and re-surface solely by controlling their buoyancy. They flood ballast tanks to submerge, then to re-surface either drop discardable ballast weights, or use stored compressed air to blow their ballast tanks clear of water, becoming buoyant again.

Submarines are larger, more sophisticated and have powerful underwater propulsion. They must travel horizontal distances submerged, require precise control of depth, yet do not descend so deeply, nor need to dive vertically on station. Their primary means of controlling depth are their diving planes (hydroplanes in UK), in combination with forward motion. At the surface the ballast tanks are emptied to give positive buoyancy. When diving, the main ballast tanks are flooded to achieve approximately neutral buoyancy. Depth control tanks are used for fine control of buoyancy by pumping water in or out to compensate for variations in weight. Ballast water can be transferred between trim tanks to balance the vessel in horizontal trim. The planes are then adjusted together to drive the hull downwards, while still level. For a steeper dive, the stern planes may be reversed and used to pitch the hull downwards.

The crew submerges the vessel by opening vents in the top of the main ballast tanks and opening valves at the bottom. Which lets water flood into the tank as air escapes through the top vents. As air escapes from the tank, the vessel's buoyancy decreases, causing it to sink. For the submarine to surface, the crew shuts the vents in the top of the ballast tanks and releases compressed air into the tanks. The high-pressure air accumulates at the top of the tanks and the air pocket pushes the water out through the bottom valves and increases the vessel's buoyancy, causing it to rise. As it rises, hydrostatic pressure decreases, causing the air to expand in the tanks and accelerate ascent rate until excess escapes through the bottom valves and maximum buoyancy occurs. A submarine may have several types of ballast tank: main ballast tanks for diving and surfacing, and trimming tanks for adjusting the submarine's attitude (its 'trim') both on the surface and when underwater, and depth control tanks for fine adjustments of buoyancy.

== Floating structures ==
Ballast tanks play a vital role in maintaining stability and functionality across various marine and offshore structures. For deepwater offshore oil platforms and floating wind turbines, ballast is used to enhance hydrostatic stability by lowering the center of mass below the center of buoyancy. This ensures that these structures remain stable, even in rough sea conditions. Additionally, ballast adjustments allow platforms to switch between a deep-draft mode optimized for reduced motion in waves and a lower-drag mode for easier towing and transport.

Floating dry docks rely on ballast tanks to sink their decks below the water level, enabling vessels to be moved into position for docking. Once secured, the ballast is discharged, lifting both the dock and the vessel above the waterline. To achieve this, the structure beneath the supporting deck is divided into multiple ballast tanks for precise control. Smaller versions, known as floating boat lifts, work on the same principle and often serve as storage facilities for individual vessels.

In dry dock and lock operations, caisson gates use ballast tanks to achieve a secure seal. These gates are floated into position, then their ballast tanks are flooded to sink them and hold them firmly over the sill. This creates a watertight seal that allows the dock or lock to be drained. Ballast systems, therefore, provide critical functionality not only for stability but also for operational flexibility in diverse marine applications.

In addition to their primary role in maintaining stability, ballast tanks in modern marine and offshore engineering are also essential for optimizing the performance of various systems. For example, in offshore platforms and floating wind turbines, advanced ballast systems are often equipped with automated control mechanisms that can continuously monitor and adjust ballast levels in response to changing sea conditions. This adaptability helps optimize performance and safety, especially in harsh environmental conditions like storms or high winds. Furthermore, new technologies such as lightweight ballast materials and hybrid systems combining water ballast with solid materials are being developed to improve efficiency and reduce the environmental impact. These advancements aim to reduce energy consumption during ballast operations and minimize the carbon footprint of offshore structures. Additionally, with the growing trend of floating structures and vessels, the design of ballast systems has evolved to include more sophisticated models that integrate fluid dynamics and real-time data analytics for enhanced control, allowing for more precise stability management and better resistance to dynamic ocean forces.

== Wakecraft ==
Most wakeboard-specific inboard-engine boats have multiple integrated ballast tanks that are filled with water by ballast pumps controlled from the helm with rocker switches. Typically the configuration is based on a three tank system with a tank in the center of the boat and two more in the rear of the boat on either side of the engine compartment. Just like larger ships when adding water ballast to smaller wakeboard boats the hull has a lower center of gravity, and increases the draft of the boat. Most wakeboard boat factory ballast systems can be upgraded with larger capacities by adding soft structured ballast bags. Increasing the displacement by ballasting causes the boat to make larger waves at any given speed, at the cost of greater power requirements and propeller loading to reach that speed.

== Aircraft ==
Ballast tanks are also used in certain types of aircraft, particularly in aerostats like balloons and airships, to maintain stability and control during flight. In these lighter-than-air vehicles, ballast plays a crucial role in adjusting buoyancy, allowing the aircraft to rise, descend, or remain at a desired altitude. Ballast in this context typically consists of materials such as water, sand, or other weighty substances that can be added or removed as needed.

Aerostats, which include both hot air balloons and dirigibles (airships), rely on the principle of buoyancy to stay aloft. The amount of ballast onboard directly affects the aircraft's ability to control its vertical position. For example, a hot air balloon may need to release ballast to increase its altitude or add ballast when descending. In contrast, airships, which have engines and a steering system, use ballast to fine-tune their vertical position, especially during maneuvering or when compensating for changes in air pressure or temperature.

In airships, ballast is particularly important for maintaining equilibrium. Airships are equipped with ballast tanks that help stabilize the craft by allowing operators to adjust the weight distribution. When an airship rises, the gas within its envelope (typically helium or hydrogen), starts to expand because the lifting gas is surrounded by less and less dense atmospheric air, giving less pushback against the envelope. This allows the lifting gas to expand, which increases the atmospheric displacement, tis increases the buoyancy, causing the airship to gain altitude. By releasing lifting gas (Helium or Hydrogen), the operator can prevent the airship from rising too quickly or losing control. Similarly, if an airship is descending too quickly or needs to stabilize at a specific height, ballast is released (sometimes referred to as 'dropping' of ballast) to compensate for insufficient buoyancy, which is the cause of the increased vertical speed during descent.

The use of ballast in aerostats is not limited to operational control alone; it also serves as a safety measure. In the event of sudden changes in weather, such as wind gusts or temperature fluctuations, ballast can be adjusted to help keep the craft steady and reduce the risk of accidents. In many modern airships, automated systems are used to monitor and manage the ballast, ensuring the aircraft maintains the optimal weight and balance throughout the flight.

Over time, the use of ballast in aerostats has evolved with technology. Historically, manual methods were employed to manage ballast, with crew members physically adding or releasing materials. Today, some modern airships and balloons use more advanced techniques, including sophisticated sensors and automated release systems, to optimize ballast management. These systems can adjust ballast levels automatically based on the altitude, weight distribution, and even the rate of ascent or descent, offering greater precision and control.

Additionally, ballast systems in aerostats are designed with considerations for environmental impact. The materials used for ballast must be easy to handle and, in some cases, environmentally friendly. For instance, some newer airships use biodegradable materials for ballast, reducing the environmental footprint of their operations. The management of ballast tanks has also become more efficient, with designs that minimize the space required for ballast storage, allowing for more room for passengers and equipment.

The relationship between ballast and buoyancy in aerostats also highlights the principles of physics at work in aviation. In a hot air balloon, the release of ballast causes the balloon to rise, while in an airship, the careful balancing of ballast ensures that the craft maintains a steady altitude. By controlling the distribution of weight, pilots can fine-tune their flight path, enabling them to navigate through varying air currents and weather conditions. This is especially important for airships, which often fly at lower altitudes and in more dynamic environments than traditional airplanes.

In military applications, ballast tanks in airships have been used for reconnaissance, surveillance, and other strategic purposes. The ability to adjust altitude precisely makes airships highly valuable for tasks that require prolonged observation, such as monitoring enemy movements or surveying large areas. Ballast management systems in these airships ensure that they can stay in position for extended periods, providing an advantage in situations where constant altitude control is needed.

In conclusion, ballast tanks in aircraft, particularly in aerostats like balloons and airships, are an integral part of flight control, offering stability, safety, and precise altitude management. Whether used in recreational hot air balloons, commercial airships, or military aerostats, ballast systems ensure that these aircraft can operate efficiently and safely in a range of conditions. As technology continues to advance, the future of ballast management in aerostats may see further innovations, enhancing control, performance, and sustainability in lighter-than-air aviation.

== Environmental concerns ==
Diagram showing the water pollution of the seas from untreated ballast water discharges

When ships take in ballast water from one body of water and release it in another, they may introduce non-native species that can harm local ecosystems and economies, like the zebra mussel, which contaminated the Great Lakes of Canada and the United States through ballast water. The mussels spread quickly, disrupting ecosystems and outcompeting native species and harming them, changing their natural distribution across the world. This is a major environmental concern often seen with macro-invertebrates and small organisms alike.

To address this problem, international regulations like the Ballast Water Management Convention require ships to treat ballast water before discharging it. Methods such as filtration and ultraviolet treatment help reduce the risk of spreading invasive species, protecting marine environments worldwide.

Macroinvertebrates can also find their way into a ballast tank, regularly being transported by transoceanic and coastal vessels arriving in ports all over the world. Researchers from Switzerland sampling 67 ballast tanks from 62 different vessels operating along geographic pathways, tested for mid ocean exchange or voyage length that had a high chance of macro-invertebrate relocating to a different part of the world. They discovered a presence of a highly invasive European green crab, mud crab, common periwinkle, soft-shell clam, and blue mussel in the ballast tanks of the sampled ships. Although the densities of macro-invertebrate were low, invasion of non-native macro-invertebrates is a danger during their mating seasons. The most serious effect is observed when a female macro-invertebrate is carrying millions of eggs per animal.

To monitor this, vessel workers check ballast tanks for living organisms that are 50 micrometers or larger. These checks also reveal information about sediment levels, such as the presence of different types of rock or soil in the tank. During sample collection, the number of organisms found in the ballast water can vary depending on the location within the tank, and patterns of sedimentation may also differ between tests.

The most effective way to sample from stratified tanks is to collect several time-integrated samples at regular intervals during the tank's discharge, this ensures a more accurate understanding of the organisms and sediments present.

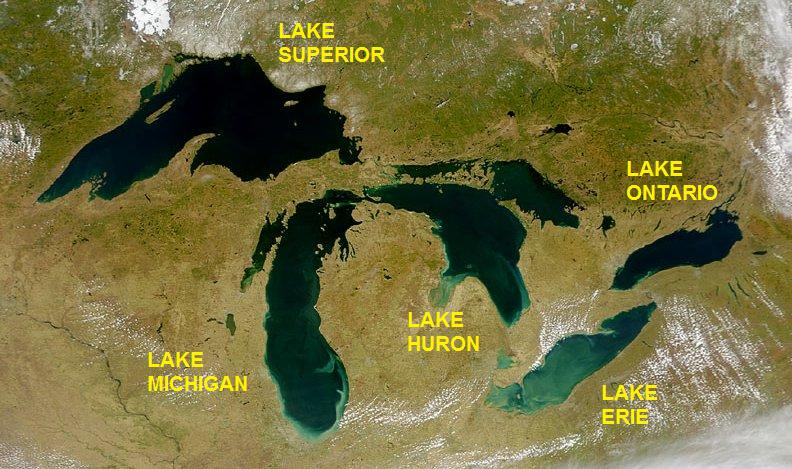
The image depicting the great lakes

All transoceanic vessels that enter the Great Lakes are required to manage ballast water and ballast tank residuals with ballast water to clear out and exchange for tank flushing. Management and procedures reduce the density and richness of biota effectively in ballast waters and thus reduce the risk of transporting organisms from other parts of the world to non-native areas. Although most ships do ballast water management not all are able to clear the tanks. In an emergency, when the crew can clean out residual organisms, they use sodium chloride (salt) brine to treat the ballast tanks. Vessels arriving in the Great Lakes, and North Sea ports, were exposed to high concentrations of sodium chloride until the mortality rate of 100% is reached. Results show that an exposure of 115% of brine is extremely effective treatment resulting in a 99.9% mortality rate of living organisms in ballast tanks regardless of the type of organism. There was a median of 0%. About 0.00%-5.33% of organisms are expect to survive treatment of the sodium chloride.

The Ballast Water Management Convention, adopted by the International Maritime Organization (IMO) on 13 February 2004, aims to prevent the spread of harmful aquatic organisms from one region to another, by establishing standards and procedures for the management and control of ships' ballast water and sediments. This entered into force worldwide on 8 September 2017. Under the convention, all ships in international traffic are required to manage their ballast water and sediments to a certain standard, according to a ship-specific ballast water management plan. All ships will also have to carry a ballast water record book and an international ballast water management certificate. The ballast water management standards will be phased in over a period of time. As an intermediate solution, ships should exchange ballast water mid-ocean. However, eventually most ships will need to install an on-board ballast water treatment system.

A number of guidelines have been developed to help implement the convention. The convention will require all ships to implement a Ballast Water and Sediments Management Plan. All ships will have to carry a Ballast Water Record Book and will be required to carry out ballast water management procedures to a given standard. Existing ships will be required to do the same, but after a phase-in period.

One of the most common problems in vessel maintenance is the corrosion that takes place in the double hull space ballast tanks occupy in merchant vessels. Bio-degradation of ballast tank coatings takes place in marine environments. Ballast tanks usually carry bacteria and other organisms, some of which can damage the ballast tank coating and structure.

Micro-cracks and small holes have been found in ballast tanks. Acidic bacteria created holes with 0.2–0.9 μm in length and 4–9 μm in width. The natural community caused cracks of 2–8 μm in depth and 1 μm in length. The bacterial affected coatings decreased in corrosion resistance, as assessed by Electrochemical Impedance Spectroscopy (EIS).

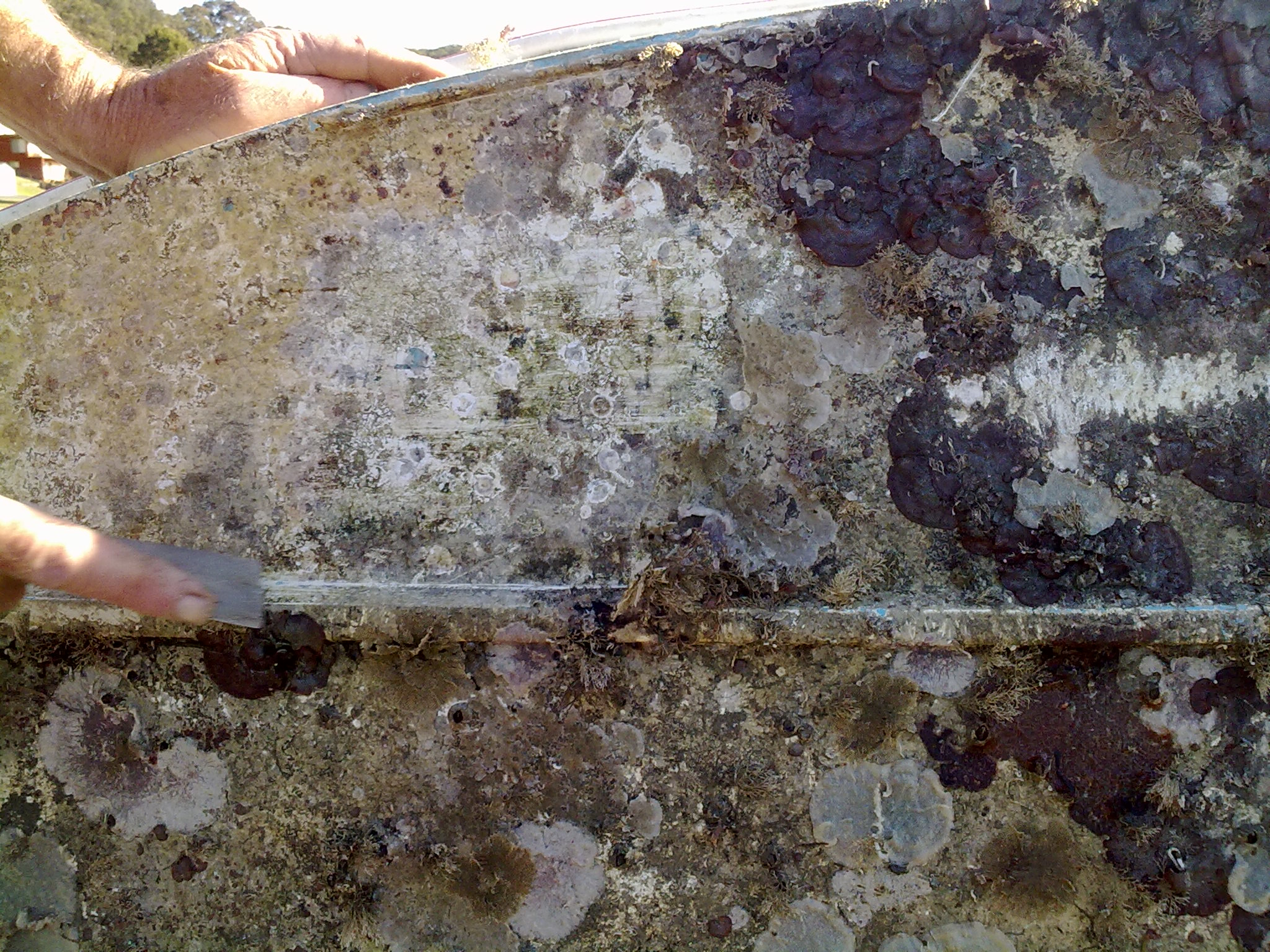
Example of Biofouling

The natural bacterial community in ballast tanks can weaken the corrosion resistance of protective coatings over time. After about 40 days of exposure, this can lead to the formation of blisters on the tank's surface. These bacteria may also contribute to specific biofilm formations, which could play a role in different types of coating damage. However, more clarity is needed on the exact mechanisms involved.

== See also ==
- Corrosion in ballast tanks
- Floating wind turbine – Type of wind turbine
- Floating oil platform – Offshore ocean structure with oil drilling and related facilities
- Kingston valve – Valve on the exterior of a ship's hull
- Saddle tank (submarine) – Submarine ballast tanks fitted in pairs along the sides of the hull
- Sailing ballast – Weight on ships lowering centre of gravity for stability
- Vent (submarine) – Valve fitted to the top of a submarine's ballast tanks
