= National Invasive Species Act =

- Long title: An Act to provide for ballast water management to prevent the introduction and spread of nonindigenous species into the waters of the United States, and for other purposes.
- Acronyms (colloquial): USNISA NISA
- Enacted by: the 104th United States Congress
- Effective: 26 October 1996

Citations
- Public law: Pub. L. 104–332 (text) (PDF)
- Statutes at Large: 110 Stat. 4073

Codification
- Acts amended: Nonindigenous Aquatic Nuisance Prevention and Control Act of 1991
- Titles amended: 16 (Conservation)
- U.S.C. sections amended: 16 U.S.C. § 4701

Legislative history
- Introduced in the House of Representatives as H.R. 4283 by Steve LaTourette (R–OH) on 28 September 1996; Signed into law by President Bill Clinton on October 26, 1996

The National Invasive Species Act (NISA) is a United States federal law intended to prevent invasive species from entering inland waters through ballast water carried by ships. NISA reauthorized and amended a previous measure, the Non-indigenous Aquatic Nuisance Prevention and Control Act of 1991 (NANPCA).

Organisms targeted by NISA are categorized as aquatic nuisance species, including in particular zebra mussels and Eurasian ruffe. To extend upon NANPCA, NISA authorizes regulation of ballast water, a key factor in the spread of aquatic invasive species; funding for prevention and control research; regional involvement with the Aquatic Nuisance Species Task Force; and education and technical assistance programs to promote compliance with the new regulations. NISA also includes specific actions for certain geographical locations, such as the Great Lakes, Chesapeake Bay, the Gulf of Mexico, and San Francisco Bay.

== Environmental issue ==
NISA directly addresses problems associated with nonindigenous species, with special attention on aquatic nuisance species in the Great Lakes. In the proper conditions, nonindigenous species can out-compete indigenous species by dominating resources or spreading diseases or parasites. These disruptions can lead to a loss of biodiversity and as a result, ecosystems and economies are greatly affected. Below are a few descriptions of nonindigenous species that are mentioned in NISA.

=== Zebra mussels ===
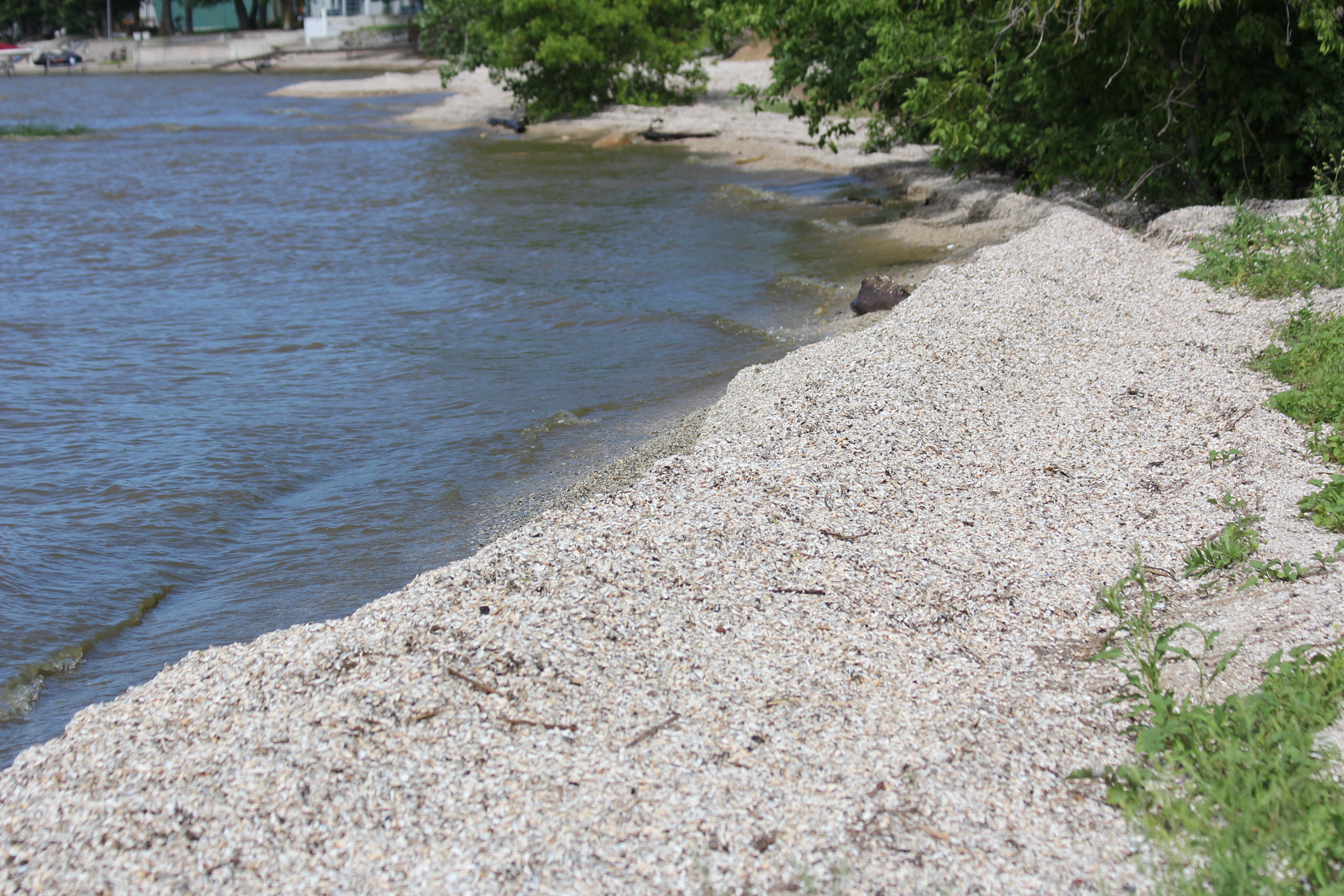
Zebra mussels line the shore of Lake Michigan

In 1988 zebra mussels (Dreissena polymorpha) were found in Lake Erie, and soon after they spread to all the Great Lakes. Since then, zebra mussels can still be found in each of the Great Lakes, as well as throughout the major navigable rivers in the eastern part of the United States (including the Hudson, St. Lawrence, and Niagara Rivers). Recent reports have revealed that this species has dispersed as far as California.

A native of southern Russia, the zebra mussel most likely made its way to North America through the release of ballast water from cargo ships traveling from the Black Sea to the Great Lakes. After its introduction there, it was carried through the lakes and connected waterways via recreational and commercial traffic. A large part of the zebra mussel's ability to disperse has to do with its travel flexibility. In the larval stage, zebra mussels can float along passively. In the adult stage, zebra mussels can attach themselves to boats very well. Overland dispersal can be achieved, too, because these mussels can survive dry conditions for several days. This was most likely the way that they were introduced to California: agricultural inspection stations have reported finding mussels on the hulls or motor compartments of at least 19 trailered boats arriving into the state. In addition to being able to travel long distances during both immature and mature stages of life, zebra mussels can produce up to several hundred thousand eggs in a single season.

Zebra mussels are most disruptive in two ways. The first is that they can colonize and clog water supply pipes, thereby restricting water flow for systems used for cooling, fire-fighting, hydroelectricity, etc. Colonies can also be very dense: it was reported that at one power plant in Michigan, 700,000/m^{2} of zebra mussels were found in the pipes, the diameters of which were reduced by two-thirds. The United States Fish and Wildlife Service once estimated that zebra mussel infestations could cost $500 million per year due to increased costs for utility companies and industrial plants, as well as loss of income revenue for fishing and fishing-related businesses. The economic repercussions of this type of species invasion can be devastating.

The second issue with zebra mussel invasions is that they can deplete food sources in aquatic ecosystems. Zebra mussels are filter feeders, meaning that they consume microorganisms, and they do so at very fast rates. Microorganisms form the bottom of the food chain, and eliminating that food source can be dangerous to the survival of native species. The spread of the nonindigenous zebra mussels have greatly decreased the numbers of native mussels in Lake St. Clair and Lake Erie, which may be at risk for extinction.

=== Eurasian ruffe ===
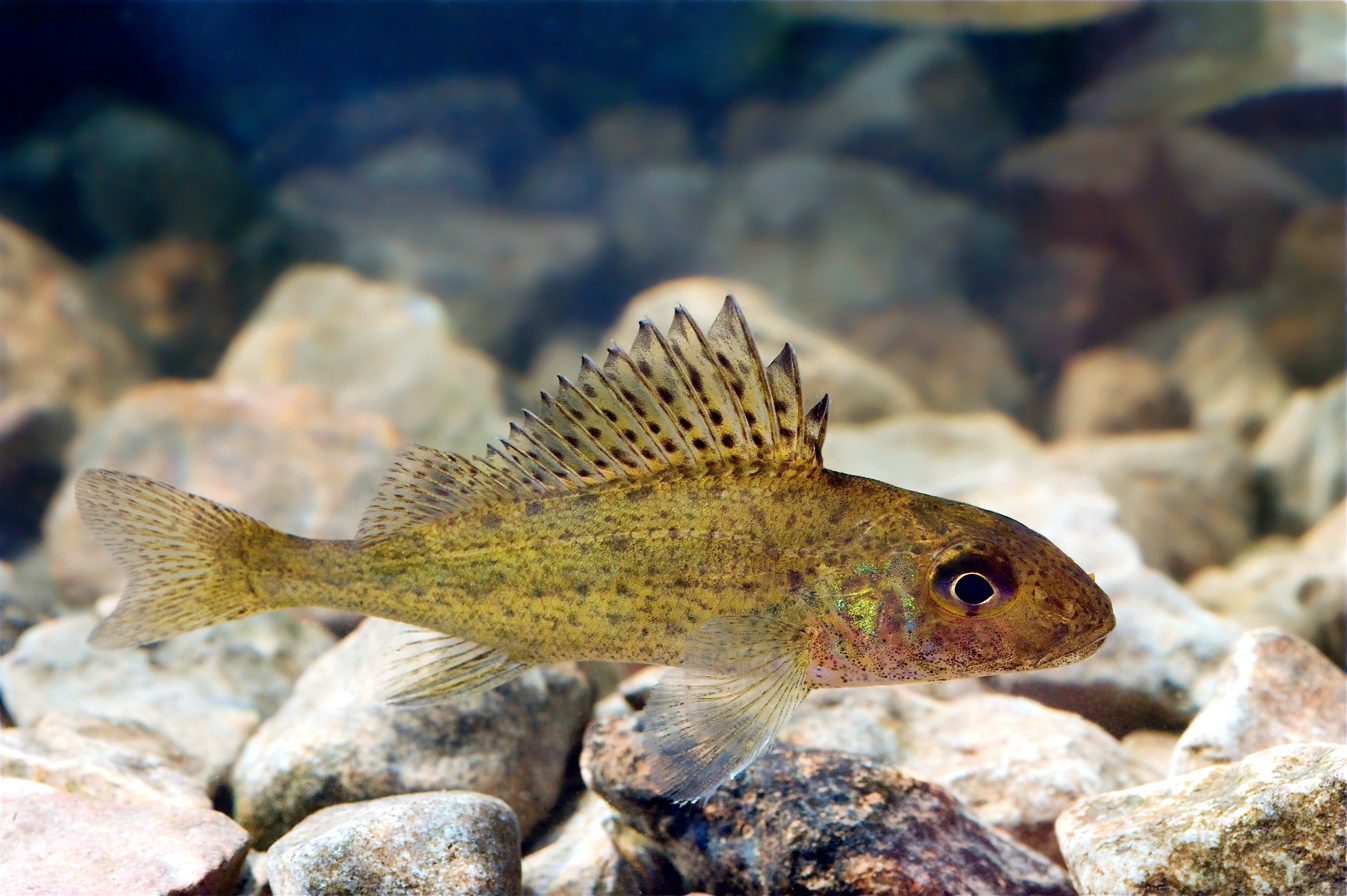
Eurasian ruffe

The Eurasian Ruffe (Gymnocephalus cernuss) is another aquatic nuisance species that has spread to the Great Lakes, Wisconsin, and Michigan, after first being discovered in the St. Louis River Estuary of the Duluth-Superior Harbor in 1986. Originally from southern Europe, the ruffe is believed to have arrived in North America through the release of ballast water from foreign seas.

The Eurasian ruffe is an extremely aggressive species. It can produce 200,000 eggs in the first batch and 6,000 eggs in later batches, and it is able to thrive in a number of different habitats where waters range from fresh to brackish, in ranges of depth from 0.25m to 85m. A fierce competitor for food sources, it feeds on plankton, bottom-dwelling insect larvae, and sometimes fish eggs. One advantage that the ruffe has over native species is better eyesight in dark conditions, allowing it to consume more food and at a quicker rate. The ruffe is now considered a dominant species in Lake Superior and the St. Louis River Estuary, and native species are becoming compromised. Early efforts to control the ruffe populations attempted to introduce predator species; however the predators preferred native fish. Current management strategies are centered more on regulating ballast water discharge, as well as focused programs for identifying, monitoring, and netting the ruffe.

=== Mitten crabs ===
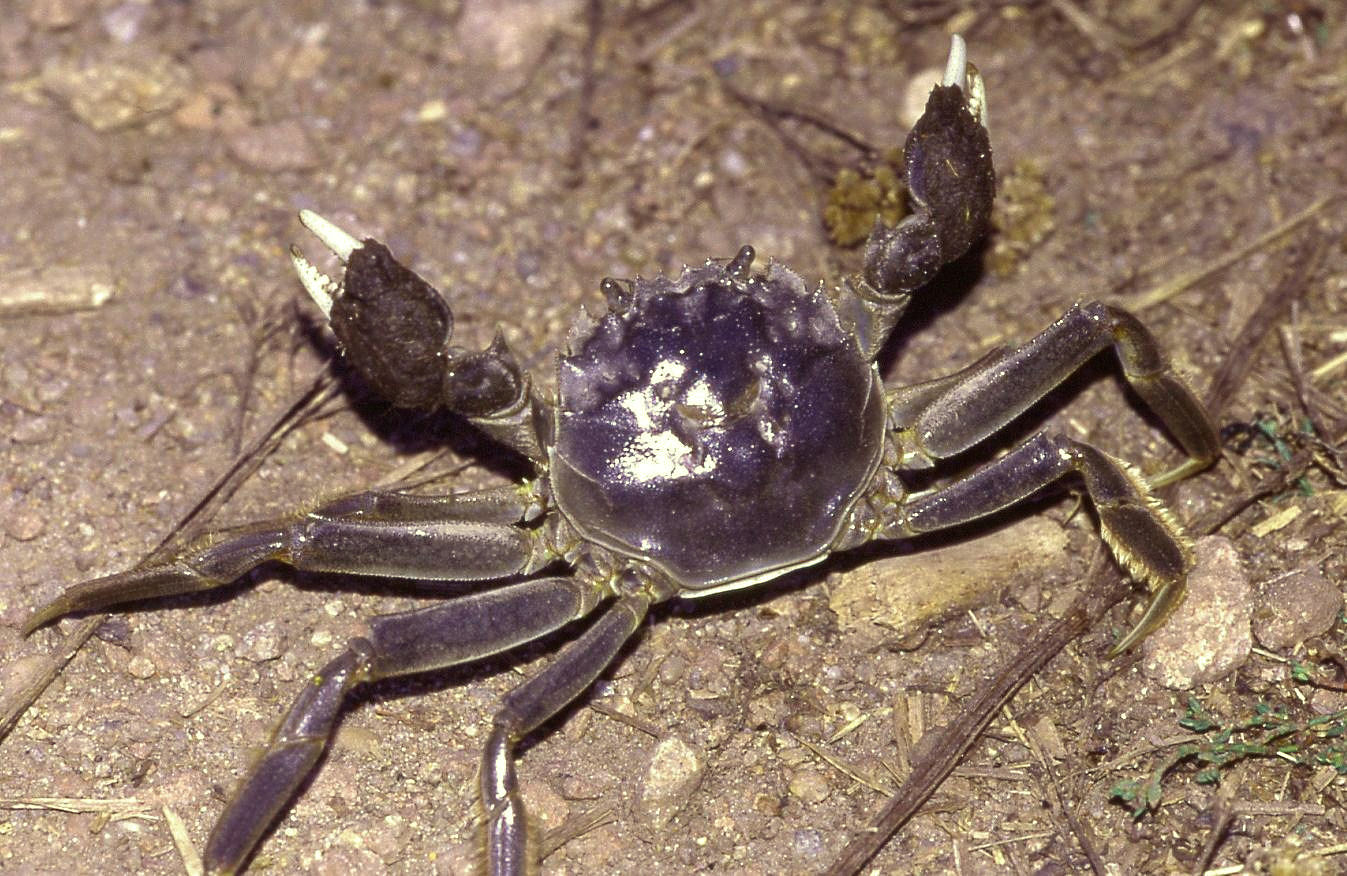
Chinese mitten crab

Mitten crabs (Eriochir sinensis) from China were first sighted in San Francisco Bay in 1992, and are suspected of being purposely introduced to initiate a fishery. Like other invasive species, the mitten crab is an ecological competitor that threatens the availability of food for native species. It also feeds on salmon eggs, which is a great problem for dwindling salmon populations in California. Although the current geographic range of the mitten crab is limited to Northern California, it is expected to move toward Oregon and Washington. In 2009, mitten crabs were reported to be found in Chesapeake Bay, Delaware Bay, the Hudson River, New York, and New Jersey.

The Chinese mitten crab also poses many threats to humans. First, they can damage the nets of commercial fisheries and clog water pipes. Second, mitten crabs tend to burrow, which can adversely affect the integrity of banks and levees. Lastly, they are a vector for the disease Asian lung fluke.

== Causes ==
=== Physical ===
==== Invasive Species ====
In general, invasive species can potentially do great damage to local environments and native species. Ecosystems across the United States, such as the San Francisco Bay, Chesapeake Bay, the Great Lakes, Hawaii, and Florida inland waters, are now host to a wide number of non-indigenous species, 15 percent of which cause serious harm. In the case of aquatic habitats, nonindigenous species can reduce nutrient availability and water quality, or make land prone to erosion, like the mitten crab that burrows into levees. Adverse impacts to other species include predation, heightened competition for food, and disease. The Aquatic Nuisance Species Task Force states that nonindigenous species have impacted 42 percent of endangered species and are an important reason in the decline of species, as well as an obstacle to environmental restoration.

==== Ballast water ====
A key component of NISA is to introduce regulations for the discharge of ballast water, which is a significant source for transporting nonindigenous species. Ballast water is water brought into holding tanks by a ship to add stabilizing weight before the ship loads cargo. When the ship is going to load and unload the cargo, it releases the ballast water at the port of entry in order to offset weight and navigate shallow port waters. It was estimated that nearly 99 percent of U.S. overseas trade is transported over water, and more than 80 million tons of ballast water, and the thousands of foreign species in it, are released into U.S. waters every year. Not all the species in ballast water can survive life in the holding tanks or are a threat to local environments, but since the species composition in ballast water is variable, unpredictable, and innumerable, the potential for introducing harmful species remains high.

=== Social ===
==== Aquarium and Ornamental Trades ====
NISA specifically identifies ballast water as a source of aquatic nuisance species, but another substantial source is from the aquarium and ornamental industry, which is worth $25 billion per year. Aquarium species are considered to be stronger than ballast water species, because they are typically traded as healthy adults capable of reproduction. Owners of exotic species may release them for a variety of reasons, including boredom, species aggression, or having to move. The United States trade of aquarium species involves over 2000 species and about 150 million exotic freshwater and marine fishes from all over the world. Regulation of this industry is not very stringent; the ease of the Internet has allowed trade to grow and federal and international policies lack teeth. Governments also do not want to hinder trade, and aquatic hobbies are sometimes promoted as environmentally-friendly, which can be attractive to certain groups.

==== Fishermen ====
The activities of fishermen have been blamed for introducing and spreading invasive species into aquatic environments. Algae can stick to the bottoms of boots and get transported from site to site. This was the case in Maryland, where invasive algae were found on the soles of felt-soled fishing boots in 2011.

Bait is another source of invasive species introduction. In Kansas City, fishermen were unwittingly using the invasive species Asian carp as bait. Asian carp is a well-known aquatic nuisance species whose presence is felt throughout the United States. In addition to competing for food sources against native species, the Asian carp can pose a large threat to human recreation: an adult carp can be so large that it can actually hit and injure water-skiers and anglers.

==== Economic ====
As previously mentioned, there are economic benefits, worth millions of dollars, to the trade of exotic species. Another economic benefit that results in invasions of exotic species is the desire to boost fisheries. Asian carp was deliberately introduced to U.S. waters by the American aquaculture industry as a source of food for fisheries and to eat algae in waste waters. The Chinese mitten crab was also suspected of arriving to the San Francisco Bay in the hopes of starting a population for hunting and trading purposes. In Alaska, residents are known to have captured oysters in the lower 48 states and brought them back to grow and harvest them. Bringing a non-native species to one's environment carries the risk of uncontrollable, large-scale problems if that species turns out to be invasive.

==== Political ====
Until NISA went into effect, federal, state, and local regulations of invasive species were not strong and were not strictly enforced. Due to the sprawling and interconnected nature of the issue, too, sometimes policies become cross-purposed. For example, the Fish and Wildlife Service is tasked with preventing the spread of aquatic nuisance species, but also must promote recreational hunting, fishing, and aquaculture, which can all be sources of invasives. Balancing the diverse needs of the American public can be problematic, and sometimes the needs of humans outweigh the need to protect the environment. Additionally, other challenges lie in coordinating international and local regulations and controls. Globalization has allowed people to travel farther and quicker, but differences in cultures and laws are difficult to navigate and they comprise a mismatched patchwork of rules.

Controlling the spread and threat of invasive species is similar to the fight against climate change. In both cases, the problems, causes, and effects are global, and therefore require global support for solutions. Unfortunately, unified agreement to combat these issues is extremely elusive. In the latest of large-scale climate change negotiations among nations, the Copenhagen Conference of December 2009 failed to resolve fundamental issues in global climate policy. The gathering of nations could not agree on policy target numbers, ideology, timelines, and other points, and the conference was considered to be a failure caused mainly by national and international politics. Similarly, there has been little international agreement about how to regulate ballast water practices, which can spread non-native species all over the world. Uniform standards would require all in the maritime industries to follow the certain practices and use certain technologies in order to prevent invasions, but these procedures can be seen as too costly and time-consuming, and there are disagreements about which to adopt. Additionally, some strategies for releasing ballast water call for doing so in open waters, far away from ports, but that can be dangerous work when ocean and weather conditions are poor. Researchers are still working out best practices for releasing or treating ballast water, as it is an undeniably complicated issue. In 2004, the World Ocean Council attempted to develop and implement regulations on ballast water through the Ballast Water Management Convention (a unit of the International Maritime Organization), but the convention was never fully accepted by the necessary 30 nations and the issue remains unresolved. Currently, regulating ballast water is more of a national, not international, endeavor.

== Policy ==
The NISA legislation was sponsored by U.S. House Representative Steve LaTourette on 28 September 1996, and it became Public Law No. 104-332 (H.R. 4283) on October 26, 1996. The law was primarily a reaction to the escalating threat of invasive species in the Great Lakes area and other parts of the United States. Its purpose is stated as: "To provide for ballast water management to prevent the introduction and spread of nonindigenous species into the waters of the United States, and for other purposes." NISA has a fairly broad approach to its goal. It authorizes the government to produce guidelines for how to guard against the introduction and dispersal of invasive species, regulations for vessel operations and crew safety, and education and training programs to promote compliance. Funding is also set aside for research on environmentally sound methods to control the spread of invasive species, and ecological surveys were ordered for certain environmentally sensitive regions of the country. Finally, it establishes the National Ballast Information Clearinghouse to provide data about ballasting practices and compliance with guidelines. The breadth of NISA touches multiple levels of government, from federal to local, because the spatial scale of dealing with invasive species ranges from large to small. Although the language of NISA mainly refers to the role of the federal government, local governments are certainly affected as well.

=== History ===
NISA is a reauthorization of NANPCA (Nonindigenous Aquatic Nuisance Prevention and Control Act of 1990). NANPCA was enacted when zebra mussels started to become a serious problem in the Great Lakes, where the animals were accumulating and impacting underwater infrastructure. One of its main goals was to establish the federal Aquatic Nuisance Species Task Force to work closely with lower levels of government in order to address the problems with zebra mussels. Another goal was to require all ships entering Great Lakes ports to exchange their ballast water in the open ocean.

Six years after NANPCA, more invasive species were found to be causing negative impacts across the country, and Congress moved to expand the original act. Through NISA, the control of invasive species moves beyond zebra mussels and ballast water, although those two issues remain high in importance and priority. According to the National Environmental Coalition on Invasive Species, these are some of the most important ways that NISA updated its predecessor NANPCA:

- Encouraging all ships entering the US to exchange their ballast water outside the 200-mile US Exclusive Economic Zone
- Requiring that these ships report whether or not they had exchanged their ballast water outside the 200-mile US Exclusive Economic Zone
- Expanding the responsibilities of the Aquatic Nuisance Species Task Force to include outreach and research, as well as developing state management plans and regional panels
- Expanding the geographical scope to include areas outside the Great Lakes region.

=== Aquatic Nuisance Species Task Force ===
The Aquatic Nuisance Species Task Force (hereafter, "the Task Force") was created by NANPCA as the "coordinating body in developing and implementing the national program for prevention, research, monitoring, and control of infestations of nonindigenous aquatic species." It is still operating today. NISA reauthorizes the Task Force, as established by NANPCA, and it is responsible for developing the guidelines, regulations, education and training programs, ecological surveys, and information clearinghouse described in the act.

The Task Force is composed of 13 federal agencies, but the Fish and Wildlife Service (FWS) and the National Oceanic and Atmospheric Administration (NOAA) are the co-chairs. Other agencies include the Coast Guard, Environmental Protection Agency, Army Corps of Engineers, Forest Service, Bureau of Land Management (BLM), and the National Park Service. FWS provides an Executive Secretary who is essentially the leader of the Task Force, responsible for not only issuing guidelines and regulations, but also for maintaining records and submitting reports to Congress. The overarching role of the Task Force is to coordinate efforts among the various agencies to achieve NISA goals, which, in addition to earlier stated activities, include supporting individual states in developing invasive species management plans and invasive species research.

=== Policy/Program Targets ===
In NISA, there are no reduction targets for decreasing the numbers of invasive species found throughout ecologically sensitive areas in the US. The development of guidelines, regulations, training and education programs, research and surveys, and the information clearinghouse is the primary goal. NISA establishes timelines for when to release the guidelines and regulations, as well as when to make regular reports to Congress about the progress of the Task Force. Another target is to encourage and promote interagency, interstate, and international cooperation and collaboration.

=== Policy Tools ===
NISA primarily works through the Task Force, and the primary focus of the Task Force is to address aquatic invasive species. For the purpose of controlling these species' introductions and dispersal, the Executive Secretary of the Task Force is given the responsibility of issuing voluntary guidelines for ships carrying ballast water. Ships are to report on whether or not they had followed the guidelines, and the Coast Guard has the responsibility of keeping records and reporting on who was complying with the guidelines. If compliance is not being met, the Task Force is then instructed by NISA to recommend mandatory regulations. However, since a target for invasive species reduction was never established, determining the right amount of compliance remains unclear. With such ambiguous targets and not much incentive to alter old behaviors, those in the shipping industry seem to have little motivation to follow the NISA guidelines.

More successful efforts of the Task Force are found in the state management plans. To date, 31 states have plans to manage aquatic nuisance species, as a result of collaboration with the Task Force. This has proven to be a better strategy for mitigating the effects of invasives, because it gives state governments the power and tools to manage their waters effectively. The plans help state governments identify problems and solutions, and allows them to work on smaller, more practicable and nuanced levels than within the federal framework. The model of the management plan also stimulates within-state support by emphasizing feasible, cost-effective measures that are subsidized by the federal government. Based on the discrepancy between the lack of broad national efforts and the proliferation of individual state plans throughout the country, it would seem that this is the more successful strategy in publicizing and managing the issue of invasive species.

The Task Force has also developed and supported regional panels to help states work with each other in dealing with invasive species. There are six panels: Western, Great Lakes, Northeast, Mississippi River Basin, Gulf and South Atlantic, and Mid-Atlantic. The panels encourage cooperation from both private and public sectors by setting priority issues, coordinating programs and efforts, and promoting research and education. These efforts have been successful in bringing together various key players to address the problems they have in common.

== Stakeholders ==
Due to the widespread and complex nature of the issue regarding invasive species and their introductions into sensitive habitats, there are a number of stakeholder groups that are affected by NISA. First, government officials and policymakers must determine the right policies to put in place in order to prevent introductions. This group ranges in scale from the federal to the state to the local, as all levels of government are at least somewhat involved with resource protection and trade in their jurisdictions. In the case of managing ballast water, technical assistance and support from biologists and ship engineers are crucial in developing guidelines that are both effective and feasible. Other governmental organizations include the regional panels set up by the Task Force.

The maritime industry is a primary target of NISA, which calls for changing traditional practices of releasing ballast water. Large ships involved in international or other long-distance trade are directly affected by NISA because it dictates how the ships should operate. Ballast water helps stabilize these ships and not much else can be substituted to fulfill the same function; therefore the owners, masters, and crews of the ships are tasked with treating the water or releasing it in a safe place. Newer ships are also being built with better ballast technology, and new trainings, education programs, and plans have been effective in raising awareness about invasive species.

=== Other Stakeholder Groups ===
There are a number of other stakeholder groups who are interested in or affected by invasive species and the waters they invade:

- Ecologists are concerned with the health and diversity of ecosystems. Invasive species can out-compete native species, thereby harming a location's natural heritage and causing monocultures, which are more vulnerable to threats and changes in the environment than are heterogeneous plant and animal communities.
- Fishermen are not explicitly targeted or addressed by NISA, but they too have a stake in the issue. Invasive species can wipe out populations of native fish and decrease the amount of available catches. Also, the bait that fishermen use can contain invasive species, so they must be mindful of what they are introducing into the water.
- Fisheries can be similarly affected by the spread of invasive species, and care must be taken to avoid initiating a fishery with a non-native species. Since fisheries produce only certain species of fish, these monoculture populations are especially vulnerable to threats.
- Those in the timber and agricultural industries need also be conscious of invasive species, even if they are aquatic. Protecting terrestrial resources helps maintain greater ecological health, and the BLM and the Forest Service are involved with the Task Force.
- Finally, the public and recreationalists must be educated about the threat of spreading invasive species. Because people have been known to release exotic pets into their local waters, and take their boats from location to location, they need to be aware of the risks involved with these behaviors.

== Evaluations ==
NISA is only one of a few federal laws aimed specifically at preventing the introduction and spread of non-native invasive species. Its scope was broader than its predecessor, NANPCA, and it initiated a number of new strategies aimed at promoting collaboration, research, and education, which have actually been more successful than the guidelines and regulations put forth. Many agree that there is much room for improvement.

One major criticism of NISA is that it does not reach far enough. By focusing so heavily on ballast water, it neglects other significant pathways of invasive species introductions, as well as geographic locations that are not common sites for transoceanic trade. Increasing populations and travels around the world contribute to the risk of introducing non-native species, and these issues must be addressed if better management and control are expected. Research from the Task Force could be used to further NISA, if it were to be reauthorized.

Another criticism of NISA is that its underlying principles need adjustment. Since it narrowly addresses ballast water and individual invasive species, it fails to examine and take into account the environment as a whole. Historically, the way to manage environmental damage was to limit that damage to a certain threshold; action would only be taken if the threshold was breached, and this was how NISA was structured. A different approach would be to use the precautionary principle to prevent introductions: if an activity carries the risk of an introduction, it should be stopped or never attempted. Prevention, rather than risk assessment, is advocated as a guiding principle. Additionally, though federal, guidelines and regulations to mitigate invasive species should be tailored to fit the specific needs of a geographical location, since each is unique in a number of ways. One solution in one part of the country may not be applicable to another part, and the original wording of NISA neglected to make geographical distinctions in terms of policy recommendations.

Recommendations for the reauthorization of NISA 1996 based on the Great Lakes Panel on ANS are as follows. 1.) Institutional framework: Because NISA is primarily upheld by the ANS Task Force, and is a solely federal agency, there is a high request to incorporate the unbiased, local expertise of the Great Lakes area to address and advance new and reoccurring ANS prevention and control. Incorporating new perspectives from a local standpoint creates innovative and practical solutions that can bolster local economies and environments. Local institutional expertise can also provide more rapid assessment and response to ANS introduction events than the traditional process of local committees having to apply for funding through the ANS Task Force. 2.) Research and monitoring: Billions of dollars are spent each year holding back populations of zebra mussel, and clearly represent the extreme measures needing to be taken just to maintain an ANS population. Increasing research and monitoring with required vessel reporting can help improve prevention efforts, and reduce further needed budgets to maintain new invasive species potentials altogether. With further research, scenarios such as ballast sediment deposition and other loopholes of ANS can standardize cargo ship maintenance, as well as other potential ANS introduction vectors. 3.) Ballast water standards: Providing numerical standards that are inclusive to vessel industries and local institutional experts can only intend to provide more robust and incentivized standards for adopting practices necessary to meet standards. An addition implementation of an incentive program can help promote standards as well. 4) Non-ballast non-indigenous species control: Create a protocol and response agency incorporated with similar frameworks to the re-evaluations of NISA for potential terrestrial and non-ballast aquatic non-indigenous nuisance species invasions.

== Limitations ==
Major limitations of NISA addresses today surround the language and structure of the act itself. Both the original NANPCA and NISA were authorized in direct response to the outbreak of zebra and quagga mussels in the Great Lakes region. They are one of only a few laws installed for ANS introduction regulation which is why there is much pressure on its reauthorization; to ensure proper coverage of a widespread issue. Criticism comes from a lack of adaptability and robustness as global trades and travel increases the number and complexity of invasive species introduction each day. For example, NISA has no standards for regulation of ballast sediments and exchange within the Great Lakes area. Incoming ships that declare “no-ballast-on-board” (NBOB), are not subject to mandatory off-shore ballast exchange. Most international cargo ships make more than just one stop once within the Great Lakes region. As cargo is exchanged at each stop, ballast is loaded, taking in or releasing excess water. This is repeating process of mixing residual sediment and water leftover in the tanks, and distributing it across the region. Most invasive organisms, such as the zebra mussel or other invertebrates, that have the resistance to live in ballast water for extended periods of time also have the ability to survive in dormant stages within sediment and residual water at the bottom of the tanks. Another limitation NISA is the exemption of ballast water cleaning for cargo ships that remain within the Exclusive Economic Zone (EEZ). In other words, as long as a cargo ship remains within 200 nautical miles off the US coast, it is not considered a biological threat to Great Lakes waters. This exempts ships from other parts of the country and entirely different ecosystems from off-coast ballast water exchange, and to exchange ballast within the Great Lakes.

== See also ==
- Invasive species in the United States
- Environment of the United States
- Endangered Species Act
