= Ship ballast =

Weight on ships lowering centre of gravity for stability

Ballast is weight placed low in ships to lower their centre of gravity, which increases stability (more technically, to provide a righting moment to resist any heeling moment on the hull). Insufficiently ballasted boats tend to tip or heel excessively in high winds. Too much heel may result in the vessel filling with water and/or capsizing. If a sailing vessel needs to voyage without cargo, then ballast of little or no value will be loaded to keep the vessel upright. Some or all of this ballast will then be discarded when the cargo is loaded.

If a cargo vessel (such as a tanker, bulk carrier or container ship) wishes to travel empty or partially empty to collect cargo, it must travel "in ballast". This keeps the vessel in trim and keeps the propeller and rudder submerged. Typically, being "in ballast" will mean flooding ballast tanks with sea water. Serious problems may arise when ballast water is discharged, as water-borne organisms can create havoc when deposited in new environments.

== Uses ==
One of the functions of a yacht's keel is to provide ballast.

Ballast takes many forms.

=== Small sailing vessels ===
The simplest form of ballast used in small day sailers is so-called "live ballast", or the weight of the crew. By sitting on the windward side of the hull, the heeling moment must lift the weight of the crew.

On more advanced racing boats, a wire harness called a trapeze is used to allow the crew to hang completely over the side of the hull without falling out; this provides much larger amounts of righting moment due to the larger leverage of the crew's weight, but can be dangerous if the wind suddenly dies, as the sudden loss of heeling moment can dump the crew in the water.

=== Larger sailing vessels ===
On larger modern vessels, the keel is made of or filled with a high density material, such as concrete, iron, or lead. By placing the weight as low as possible (often in a large bulb at the bottom of the keel) the maximum righting moment can be extracted from the given mass. Traditional forms of ballast carried inside the hull were stones or sand.

There are disadvantages to using high-density ballast. The first is the increased mass of the boat; a heavier boat sits lower in the water, increasing drag when it moves, and is generally less responsive to steering. A heavier boat is also more difficult to put on a trailer and tow behind an automobile. Secondly, since the ballast needs to be as low as possible, it is often placed into a centerboard or retracting keel, requiring a heavy-duty mechanism to lift the massive foil. The simplest solution is to use a fixed ballasted keel, but that makes the boat nearly incapable of sailing in very shallow water, and more difficult to handle when out of the water.

=== Canting keel ===
While prohibited by most class racing rules, some cutting-edge boats use a bulb of ballast on a long, thin keel that can tilt from side to side to create a canting keel. This lets the ballast be placed on the windward side, providing a far greater righting moment with a lower angle of heel. Tilting the keel, however, greatly reduces its lift, so canting keels are usually combined with a retractable centerboard or daggerboard that is deployed when the keel is tilted, and retracted (to reduce drag) when the keel is returned to the vertical. Some canting keels are designed so that when fully extended to either side they have an angle of attack of about 5° allowing the hydrofoil effect of the blade to lift the boat up and reduce wetted surface area for an increase in boat speed.

== Water ballast ==
=== Sailing vessels ===
A common type of ballast for small boats that avoids many of the problems of high-density ballast is water ballast. While it may seem counter-intuitive that placing water in the hull (which is, after all, close to the same density as the water outside the hull – fresh vs salt water) would add any stability, the water serves to displace air from the bottom of the hull; adding water ballast below the vertical center of gravity increases stability. The water ballast does not need to be lifted above the waterline to affect stability, as any material having greater bulk density than air will have an effect on the centre of gravity. It is the relationship between centre of gravity and centre of buoyancy that dictates the righting moment.

The advantage of water ballast is that the tanks can be emptied, reducing draft the weight of the boat (e.g. for transport on ground) and water added back in (in small boats, simply by opening up the valves and letting the water flow in) after the boat is launched or cargo unloaded. Pumps can also be used to empty the leeward ballast tank and fill the windward tank as the boat tacks, and the quantity of ballast can be varied to keep the boat at the optimum angle of heel.

A disadvantage of water ballast is that water is not very dense and therefore the tanks required take up more space than other forms of ballast. Some manufacturers offer flexible ballast bags that are mounted outboard of the hull on both sides, and pumps that use the boat's speed through the water for power. When under way, the pump can be used to fill the windward side, while the lee side is allowed to drain. This system, while not very attractive, does allow significant gains in righting force with no modifications to the hull.

A trick commonly used on boats with water ballast is to link port and starboard tanks with a valved pipe. When preparing to tack, the valve is opened, and water in the windward tank, which is higher, is allowed to flow to the lee side, and the sheet is let off to keep the boat from heeling too far. Once as much water as possible has been transferred to the lee side, the boat is brought about and the sail sheeted in, lifting the newly full windward tank. A simple hand pump can then be used to move any remaining water from the lee to the windward tank.

=== Powered vessels ===
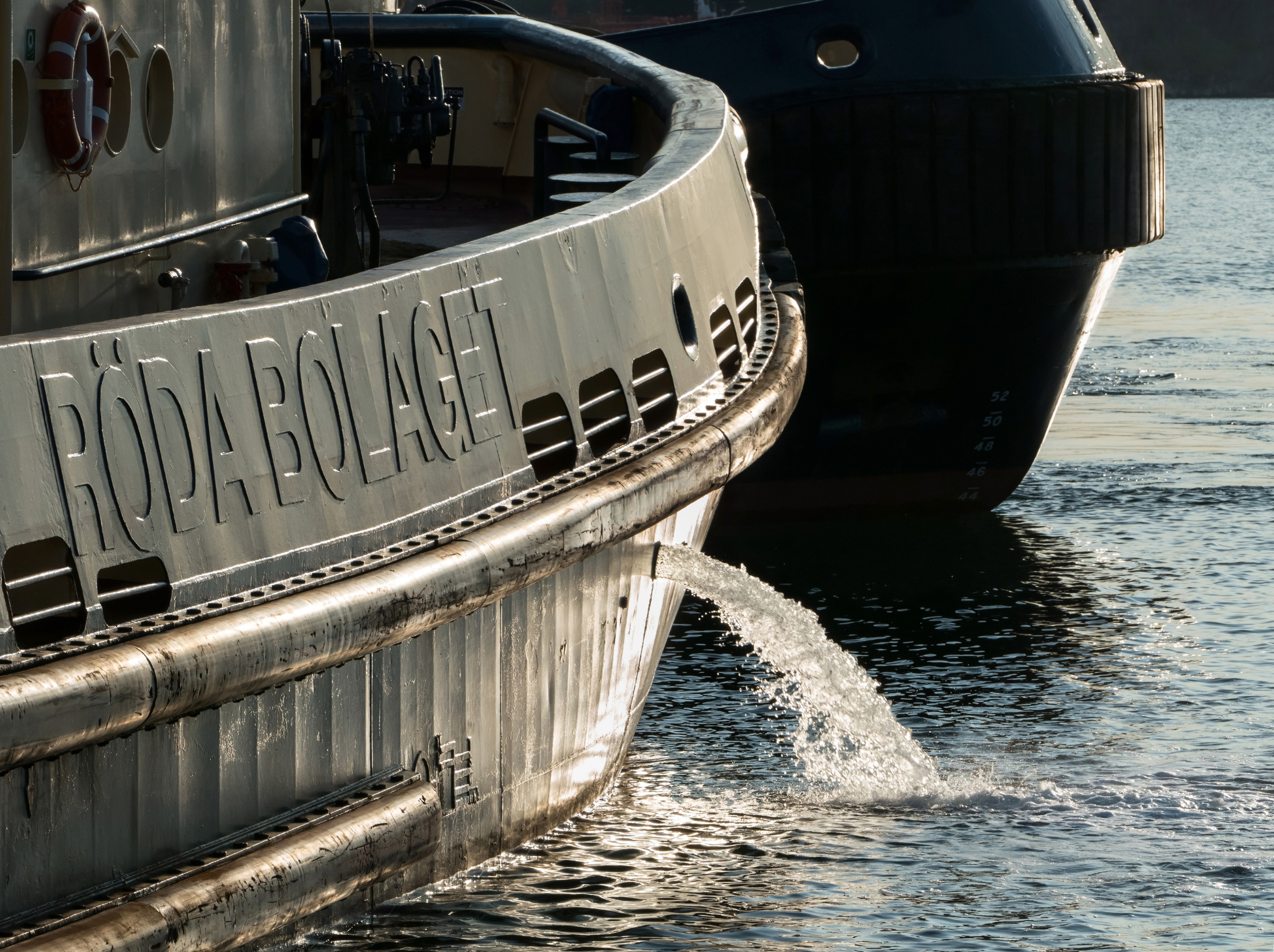
Tugboat Boss discharging ballast water before departure

On empty cargo vessels water is added to ballast tanks to increase propeller immersion, to improve steering, and to control trim and draft.

=== Environmental impacts and regulations ===
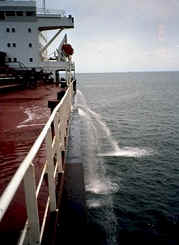
A cargo ship discharging ballast water into the sea.

Diagram showing the water pollution of the seas from untreated ballast water discharges

Ballast water discharges by ships can have a negative impact on the marine environment. The discharge of ballast water and sediments by ships is governed globally under the Ballast Water Management Convention, since its entry into force in September 2017. It is also controlled through national regulations, which may be separate from the Convention, such as in the United States.

Cruise ships, large tankers, and bulk cargo carriers use a huge amount of ballast water, which is often taken on in the coastal waters in one region after ships discharge wastewater or unload cargo, and discharged at the next port of call, wherever more cargo is loaded. Ballast water discharge typically contains a variety of biological materials, including plants, animals, viruses, and bacteria. These materials often include non-native, nuisance, and exotic species that can cause extensive ecological and economic damage to aquatic ecosystems, along with serious human health issues including death. Although similarly harmful to the environment, ballast water discharge is different from bilge pollution, which occurs when pollutants from a ship's heavy machinery leak into the ocean.

== See also ==
- Ballast
- Environmental issues with shipping
